= MOC Public Targeting Program =

Program following the Mars Global Surveyor's pictures of Mars

The MOC Public Targeting Program was a very popular program that followed the Mars Global Surveyor's pictures of Mars. A total of 4,636 requests came in from the general public. Of these, 1,086 were photographed by the Mars Observer Camera. Many of the requests eventually resulted in publications. A little more than half of the requests came from a single member of the general public. One of the people wrote in the Planetary Report that working with MGS was as exciting as being a football fan able to run a few plays in the Super Bowl. Images from the Public Target program can be found at http://www.msss.com/moc_gallery/

== Examples of pictures taken through Public Target program ==
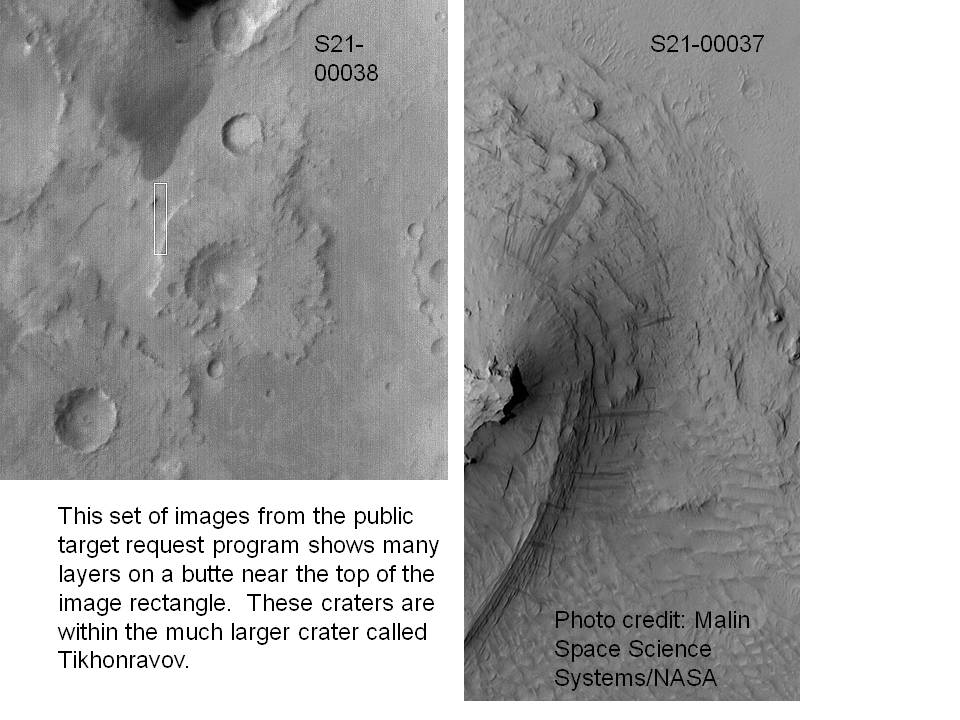
Pedestal craters and layers in Tikonravev Crater in Arabia, as seen by Mars Global Surveyor (MGS) with the Mars Orbiter Camera, under the MOC Public Targeting Program. Layers may form from volcanoes, the wind, or by deposition under water. Some researchers believe this crater once held a massive lake.

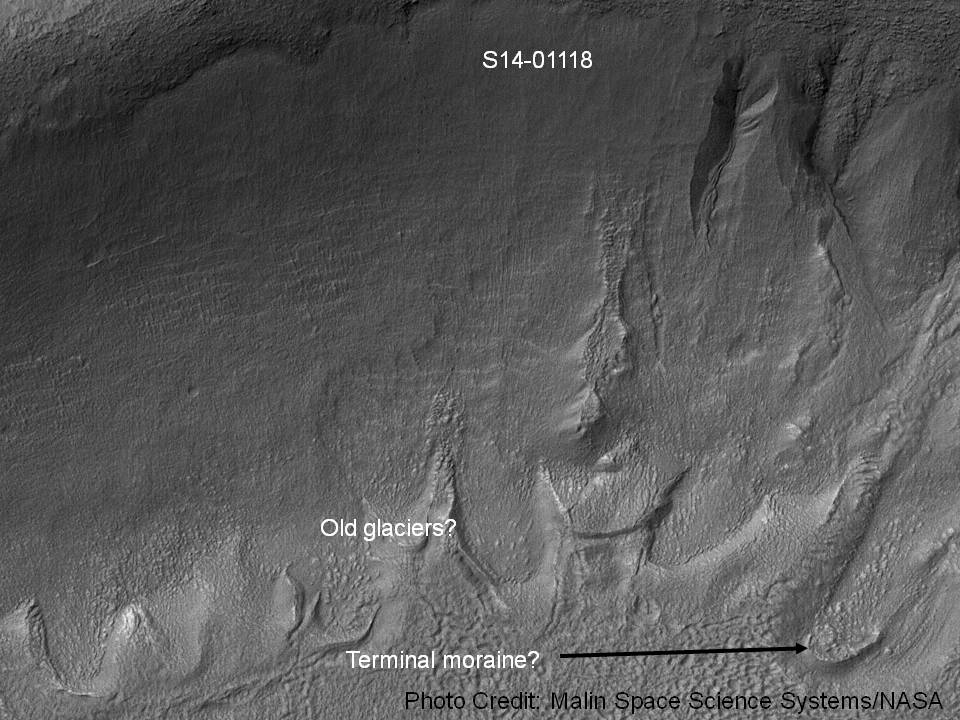
Gullies in a crater in Eridania, north of the large crater Kepler. Also, features that may be remains of old glaciers are present. One, to the right, has the shape of a tongue. Image taken with Mars Global Surveyor, under the Public Target program.

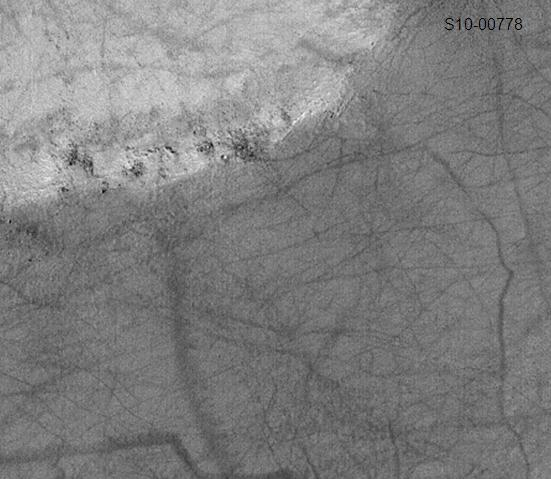
Pattern of large and small tracks made by giant dust devils as seen by Mars Global Surveyor.

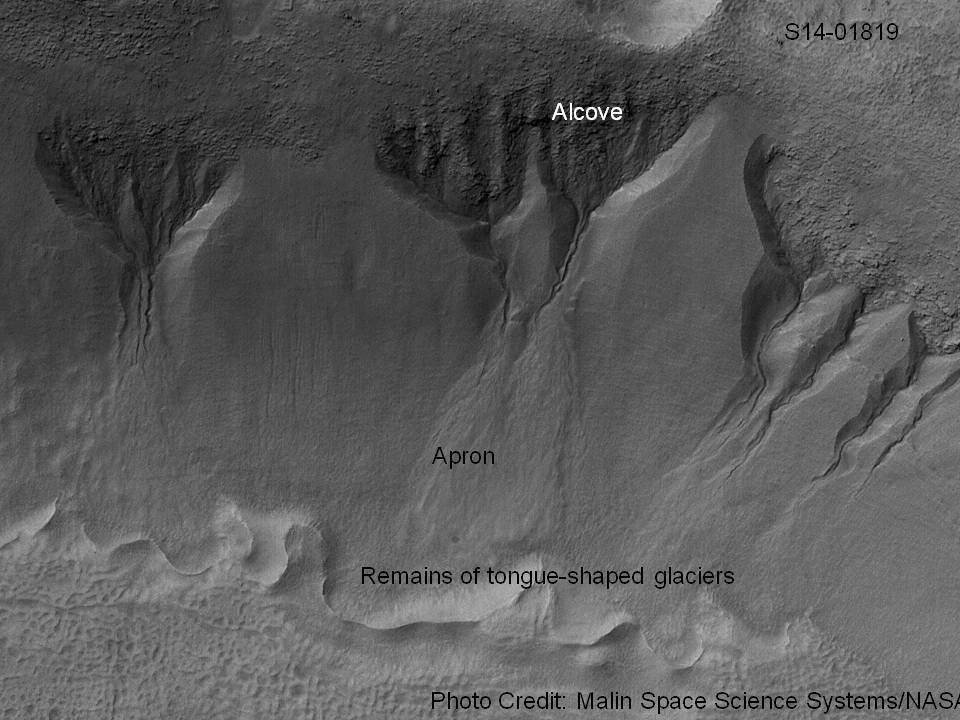
Group of gullies on north wall of crater that lies west of the crater Newton (41.3047 degrees south latitude, 192.89 east longitide). Image taken with Mars Global Surveyor under the MOC Public Targeting Program.

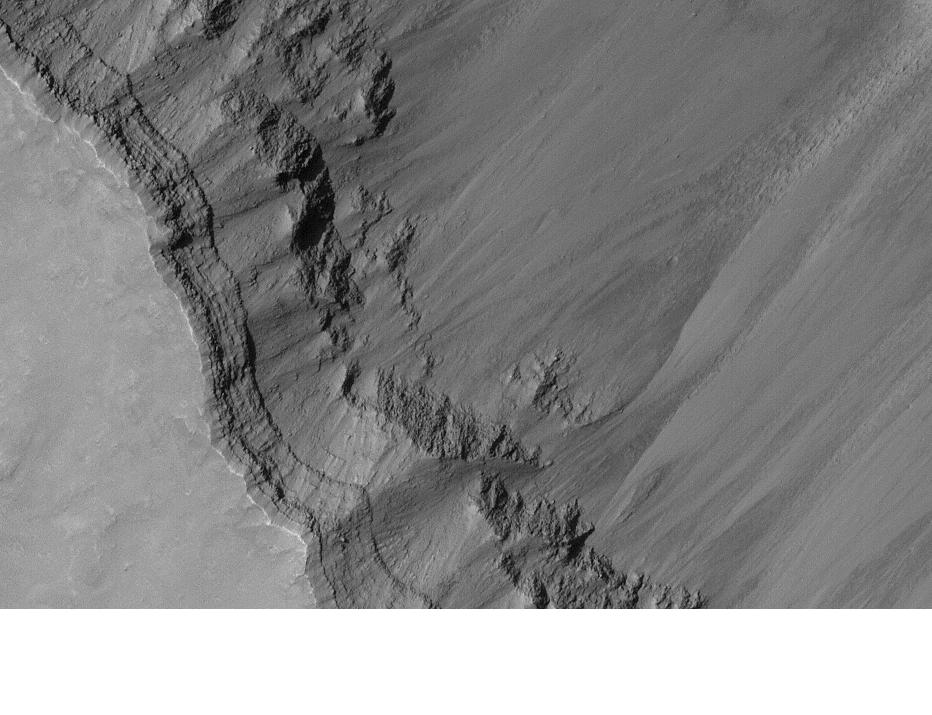
Layers in the canyon wall in Coprates quadrangle, as seen by Mars Global Surveyor, under MOC Public Targeting Program.

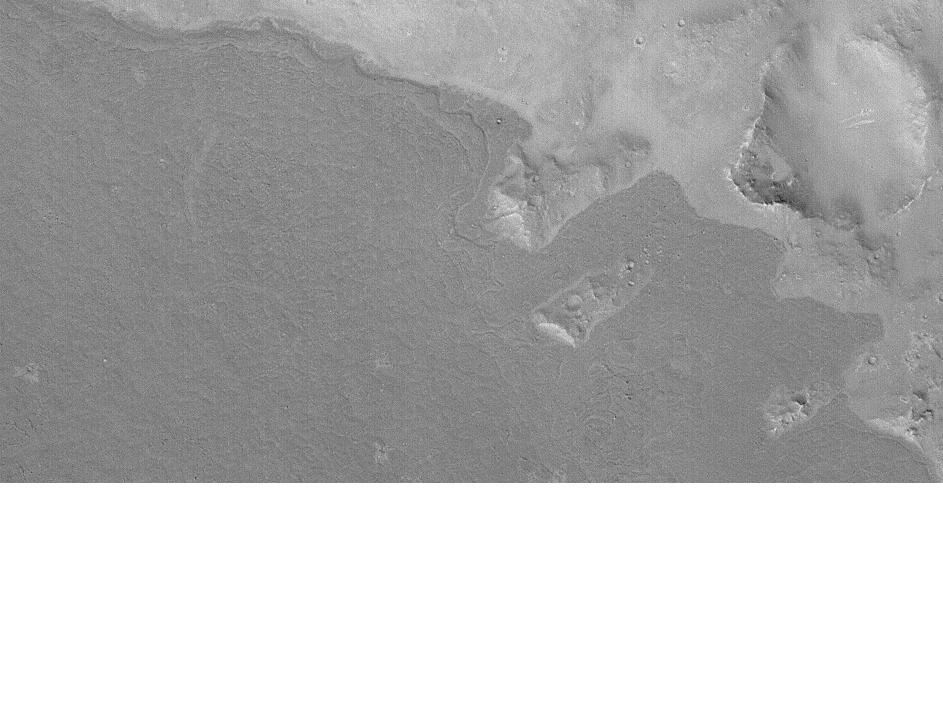
Lava flow in Elysium. There are many lava flows in the Elysium quadrangle. In this one, the lava flowed toward the upper right. Image taken by Mars Global Surveyor, under the MOC Public Targeting Program.

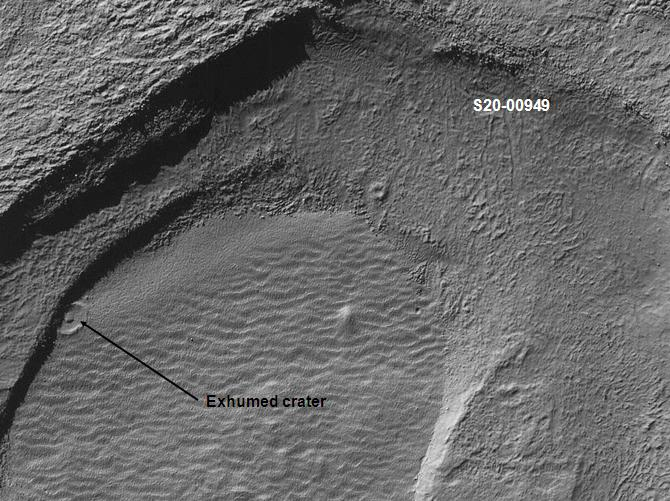
Crater that was buried in another age and is now being exposed by erosion, as seen by the Mars Global Surveyor under the MOC Public Targeting Program. Image is located in the Noachis quadrangle.

== See also ==
- HiWish program
- Mars Global Surveyor
- Mars Orbiter Camera
