= Mars Global Surveyor =

NASA orbiter mission to Mars (1996–2006)

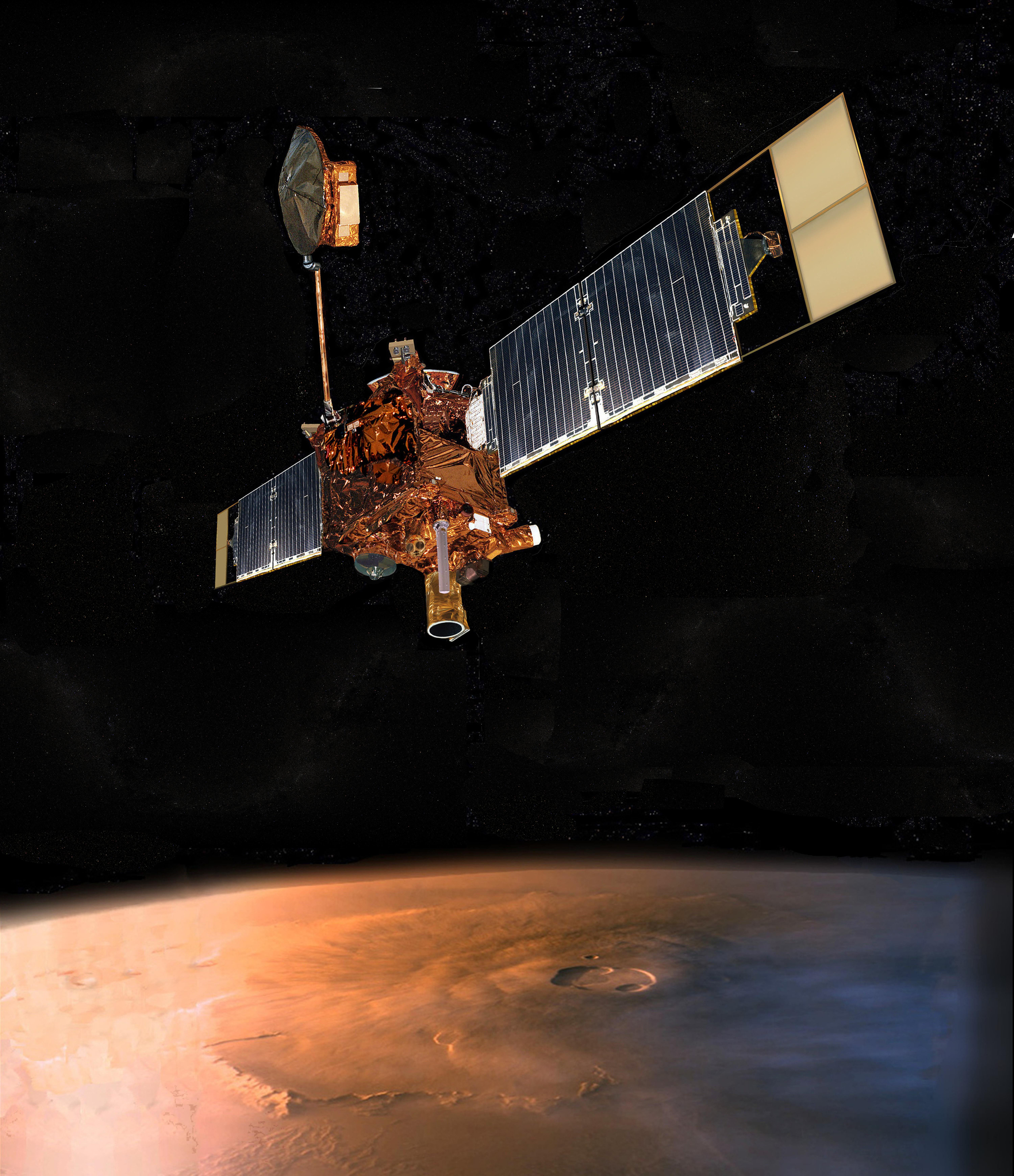
- Mission type: Mars orbiter
- Operator: NASA / JPL
- COSPAR ID: 1996-062A
- SATCAT no.: 24648
- Website: science.nasa.gov
- Mission duration: 9 years, 11 months and 26 days

Spacecraft properties
- Dry mass: 1,030.5 kg (2,272 lb)
- Power: 980 watts

Start of mission
- Launch date: 7 November 1996, 17:00 UTC
- Rocket: Delta II 7925; D-239
- Launch site: Cape Canaveral LC-17A
- Contractor: Boeing IDS

End of mission
- Disposal: Derelict
- Last contact: 2 November 2006; Last telemetry 5 November 2006; Last signal received
- Decay date: 2050 (estimated)

Orbital parameters
- Reference system: Areocentric
- Regime: Sun-synchronous
- Semi-major axis: 3,769 km (2,342 mi)
- Eccentricity: 0.008
- Periareion altitude: 372.8 km (231.6 mi)
- Apoareion altitude: 436.5 km (271.2 mi)
- Inclination: 92.9 degrees
- Period: 1.95 hours
- Epoch: 10 December 2004

Mars orbiter
- Orbital insertion: 11 September 1997, 01:17 UTC; MSD 43972 16:29 AMT
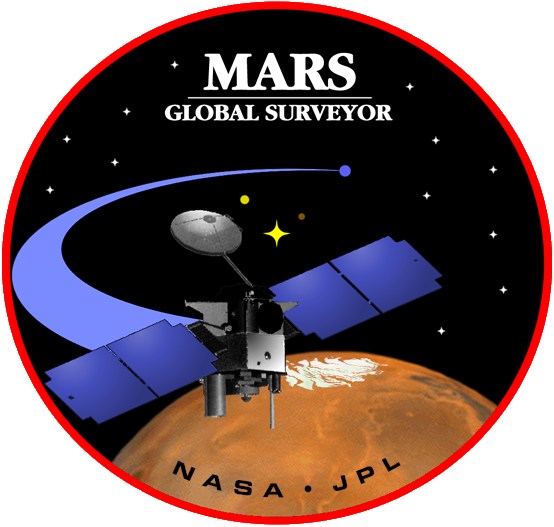
- Mars Exploration Program

Mars Global Surveyor (MGS) was an American robotic space probe developed by NASA's Jet Propulsion Laboratory. It was launched on 7 November 1996, and collected data in orbit around Mars from 1997 to 2006. MGS was a global mapping mission that examined the entire planet, from the ionosphere down through the atmosphere to the surface. As part of the larger Mars Exploration Program, Mars Global Surveyor performed atmospheric monitoring for sister orbiters during aerobraking, and helped Mars rovers and lander missions by identifying potential landing sites and relaying surface telemetry.

The spacecraft completed its primary mission in January 2001 and was in its third extended mission phase when, on 2 November 2006, it failed to respond to messages and commands. A faint signal was detected three days later which indicated that it had gone into safe mode. Attempts to recontact the spacecraft and resolve the problem failed, and NASA officially ended the mission in January 2007. An investigation attributed the loss of the spacecraft to a flaw in an update to its system software. MGS remains in a stable near-polar circular orbit at about 450 km altitude and as of 1996, was expected to crash onto the surface of the planet in 2050.

== Objectives ==
Mars Global Surveyor achieved the following science objectives during its primary mission:

1. Characterize the surface features and geological processes on Mars.
2. Determine the composition, distribution and physical properties of surface minerals, rocks and ice.
3. Determine the global topography, planet shape, and gravitational field.
4. Establish the nature of the magnetic field and map the crustal remnant field.
5. Monitor global weather and the thermal structure of the atmosphere.
6. Study interactions between Mars's surface and the atmosphere by monitoring surface features, polar caps that expand and recede, the polar energy balance, and dust and clouds as they migrate over a seasonal cycle.

Mars Global Surveyor also achieved the following goals of its extended mission:

1. Continued weather monitoring to form a continuous set of observations with NASA's Mars Reconnaissance Orbiter, which reached Mars in March 2006.
2. Imaging of possible landing sites for the 2007 Phoenix spacecraft, and the 2011 Curiosity rover.
3. Observation and analysis of key sites of scientific interest, such as sedimentary-rock outcrop sites.
4. Continued monitoring of changes on the surface due to wind and ice.

== Mission timeline ==
- 7 November 1996: Launch from Cape Canaveral.
- 11 September 1997: Arrival at Mars, began orbit insertion.
- 1 April 1999: Primary mapping phase began.
- 1 February 2001: First extended mission phase began.
- 1 February 2002: Second extended mission phase began.
- 1 January 2003: Relay mission began.
- 30 March 2004: MGS photographed the Mars Exploration Rover Spirit along with its wheel tracks showing its first 85 sols of travel.

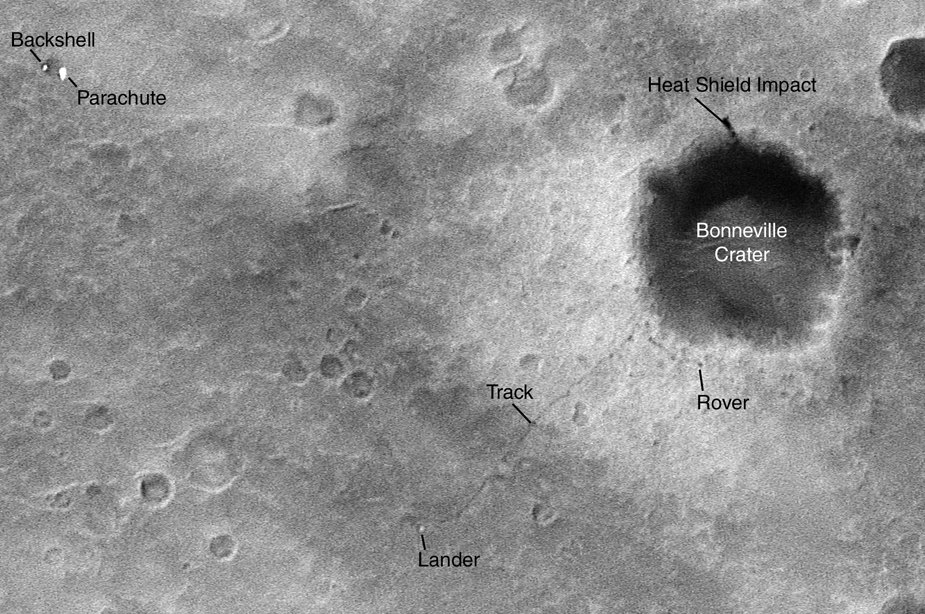
The Mars rover Spirit's landing site and tracks taken by MGS

- 1 December 2004: Science and Support mission began.
- April 2005: MGS became the first spacecraft to photograph another spacecraft in orbit around a planet other than Earth when it captured two images of the Mars Odyssey spacecraft and one image of the Mars Express spacecraft.

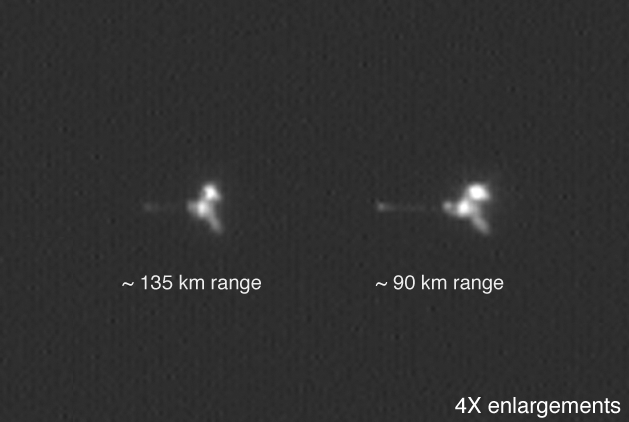
The Mars Odyssey spacecraft image taken by Mars Global Surveyor

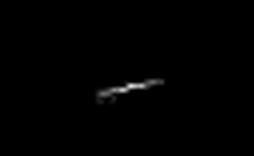
Mars Express Seen by Mars Global Surveyor

- 1 October 2006: Extended mission phase began for another two years.
- 2 November 2006: Spacecraft suffers an error while attempting to reorient a solar panel and communication was lost.
- 5 November 2006: Weak signals were detected, indicating the spacecraft was awaiting instructions. The signal cut out later that day.
- 21 November 2006: NASA announces the spacecraft has likely finished its operating career.
- 6 December 2006: NASA releases imagery taken by MGS of a newly found gully deposit, suggesting that water still flows on Mars.
- 13 April 2007: NASA releases its Preliminary Report on the cause(s) of MGS loss of contact.

=== Loss of contact ===
On 2 November 2006, NASA lost contact with the spacecraft after commanding it to adjust its solar panels. Several days passed before a faint signal was received indicating that the spacecraft had entered safe mode and was awaiting further instructions.

On 21 and 22 November 2006, MGS failed to relay communications to the Opportunity rover on the surface of Mars. In response to this complication, Mars Exploration Program manager Fuk Li stated, "Realistically, we have run through the most likely possibilities for re-establishing communication, and we are facing the likelihood that the amazing flow of scientific observations from Mars Global Surveyor is over."

On 13 April 2007, NASA announced the loss of the spacecraft was caused by a flaw in a parameter update to the spacecraft's system software. The spacecraft was designed to hold two identical copies of the system software for redundancy and error checking. Subsequent updates to the software encountered a human error when two independent operators updated separate copies with differing parameters. This was followed by a corrective update that unknowingly included a memory fault which resulted in the loss of the spacecraft.

Originally, the spacecraft was intended to observe Mars for 1 Martian year (approximately 2 Earth years). However, because it produced valuable data, NASA extended the mission three times. MGS remains in a stable near-polar circular orbit at about 450 km altitude, and was expected to crash onto the surface of the planet at some point after about 2047 at the time of its original launch, having by then spent fifty years orbiting the red planet. This is to prevent contamination of the Martian surface with any germs that may be stuck to the spacecraft.

== Spacecraft overview ==
The spacecraft, fabricated at the Lockheed Martin Astronautics plant in Denver, is a rectangular-shaped box with wing-like projections (solar panels) extending from opposite sides. When fully loaded with propellant at the time of launch, the spacecraft weighed 1,030.5 kg (2,272 lb). Most of its mass lies in the box-shaped module occupying the center portion of the spacecraft. This center module is made of two smaller rectangular modules stacked on top of each other, one of which is called the equipment module and holds the spacecraft's electronics, science instruments, and the 1750A mission computer. The other module, called the propulsion module, houses its rocket engines and propellant tanks. The Mars Global Surveyor mission cost about $154 million to develop and build and $65 million to launch. Mission operations and data analysis cost approximately $20 million/year.

=== Scientific instruments ===
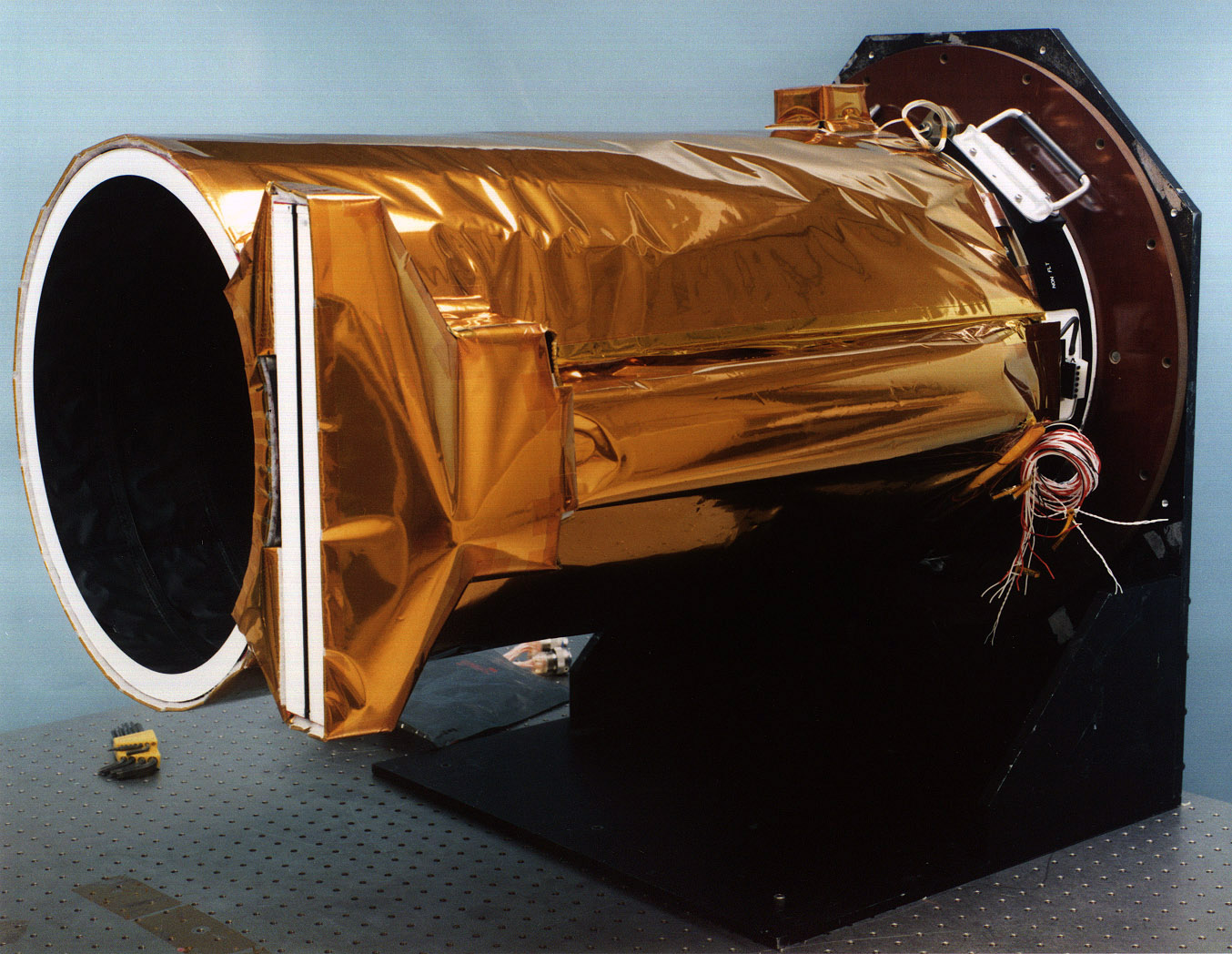
The Mars Orbiter Camera

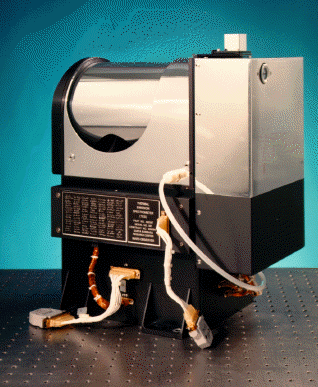
TES

Five scientific instruments flew aboard MGS:

- The Mars Orbiter Camera (MOC) operated by Malin Space Science Systems – The Mars Orbiter Camera (MOC), originally known as Mars Observer Camera, used 3 instruments: a narrow angle camera that took (black-and-white) high resolution images (usually 1.5 to 12 m per pixel) and red and blue wide angle cameras for context (240 m per pixel) and daily global imaging (7.5 km per pixel). MOC returned more than 240,000 images spanning portions of 4.8 Martian years, from September 1997 and November 2006.
- The Mars Orbiter Laser Altimeter (MOLA) – MOLA was designed to determine Mars's global topography. It operated as an altimeter until a portion of the laser reached end-of-life in June 2001. The instrument then functioned as a radiometer until October 2006.

High resolution topographic map of Mars based on the Mars Global Surveyor laser altimeter research led by Maria Zuber and David Smith. North is at the top. Notable features include the Tharsis volcanoes in the west (including Olympus Mons), Valles Marineris to the east of Tharsis, and Hellas basin in the southern hemisphere.

- The Thermal Emission Spectrometer (TES) – This instrument mapped the mineral composition of the surface by scanning thermal emissions.
- A magnetometer and electron reflectometer (MAG/ER) – This instrument was used to interrogate the planet's magnetic fields and determined that Mars does not have a global magnetic field but rather many smaller localized fields.
- The Ultrastable Oscillator (USO/RS) – Precise clock measurements from this device were used to map variations in the gravitational field.
- The Mars Relay (MR) – The Mars Relay antenna supported the Mars Exploration Rovers for data relay back to Earth in conjunction with the Mars Orbiter Camera's 12 MB memory buffer.

== First complete test of aerobraking ==
The spacecraft was launched from a smaller Delta II rocket, necessitating restrictions in spacecraft weight. In order to achieve the near-circular orbit required for the mission while conserving propellant, the team designed a series of aerobraking maneuvers. Aerobraking had been successfully attempted by the Magellan mission at Venus, but the first complete test of the new procedure was to be carried out by MGS.

Initially, MGS was placed in a highly elliptical orbit that took 45 hours to complete. The orbit had a periapsis of 262 km (163 mi) above the northern hemisphere, and an apoapsis of 54,026 km (33,570 mi) above the southern hemisphere. This would subsequently be adjusted into its circular science orbit.

After orbital insertion, MGS performed a series of orbit changes to lower the periapsis of its orbit into the upper fringes of the Martian atmosphere at an altitude of about 110 km (68 mi). During every atmospheric pass, the spacecraft slowed down because of atmospheric resistance. This slowing caused the spacecraft to lose altitude on its next pass through the orbit's apoapsis. MGS had planned to use this aerobraking technique over a period of four months to lower the high point of its orbit from 54,000 km (33,554 mi) to altitudes near 450 km (280 mi).

About one month into the mission, it was discovered that air pressure from the planet's atmosphere caused one of the spacecraft's two solar panels to bend backwards. The panel in question had incurred a small amount of damage shortly after launch, the extent of which did not become apparent until subjected to atmospheric forces. MGS had to be raised out of the atmosphere to prevent further damage to the solar panel and a new mission plan had to be developed.

From May to November 1998, aerobraking was temporarily suspended to allow the orbit to drift into the proper position with respect to the Sun and enable optimal use of the solar panels. Although data collection during aerobraking was not in the original mission plan, all science instruments remained functional and acquired vast amounts of data during this "unexpected bonus period of observation". The team was able to evaluate more information about the atmosphere over a range of times rather than the anticipated fixed times of 0200 and 1400, as well as collect data during three close encounters with Phobos.

Finally, from November 1998 to March 1999, aerobraking resumed and shrank the high point of the orbit down to 450 km (280 mi). At this altitude, MGS circled Mars once every two hours. Aerobraking was scheduled to terminate at the same time the orbit drifted into its proper position with respect to the Sun. In the desired orientation for mapping operations, the spacecraft always crossed the day-side equator at 14:00 (local Mars time) moving from south to north. This geometry was selected to enhance the total quality of the science return.

== Mission results ==
=== Mapping ===
The spacecraft circled Mars once every 117.65 minutes at an average altitude of 378 km (235 mi). The nearly polar orbit (inclination = 93°) which is almost perfectly circular, moved from the south pole to the north pole in just under an hour. The altitude was chosen to make the orbit Sun-synchronous, so that all images that were taken by the spacecraft of the same surface features on different dates were taken under identical lighting conditions. After each orbit, the spacecraft viewed the planet 28.62° to the west because Mars had rotated underneath it. In effect, it was always 14:00 for MGS as it moved from one time zone to the next exactly as fast as the Sun. After seven sols and 88 orbits, the spacecraft would approximately retrace its previous path, with an offset of 59 km to the east. This ensured eventual full coverage of the entire surface.

In its extended mission, in addition to studying the planet directly beneath it, MGE performed rolls and pitches to acquire images off its nadir track. The roll maneuvers, called ROTOs (Roll Only Targeting Opportunities), rolled the spacecraft left or right from its ground track to shoot images as much as 30° from nadir. It was possible for a pitch maneuver to be added to compensate for the relative motion between the spacecraft and the planet. This was called a CPROTO (Compensation Pitch Roll Targeting Opportunity), and allowed for high resolution imaging by the onboard MOC (Mars Orbiting Camera).

In addition to this, MGS could shoot pictures of other orbiting bodies, such as other spacecraft and the moons of Mars. In 1998 it imaged what was later called the Phobos monolith, found in MOC Image 55103.

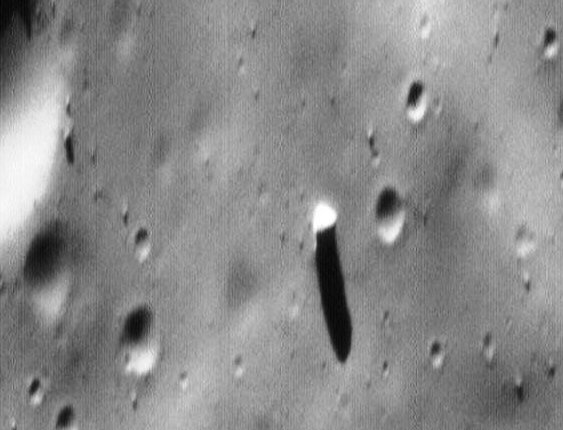
The Phobos monolith (right of center) as taken by MGS (MOC Image 55103) in 1998

After analyzing hundreds of high-resolution pictures of the Martian surface taken by the spacecraft, a team of researchers found that weathering and winds on the planet create landforms, especially sand dunes, similar to those in some deserts on Earth.

Other discoveries from this mission are:

- Mars has a layered crust to depths of 10 km or more. To produce the layers, large amounts of material had to be weathered, transported and deposited.
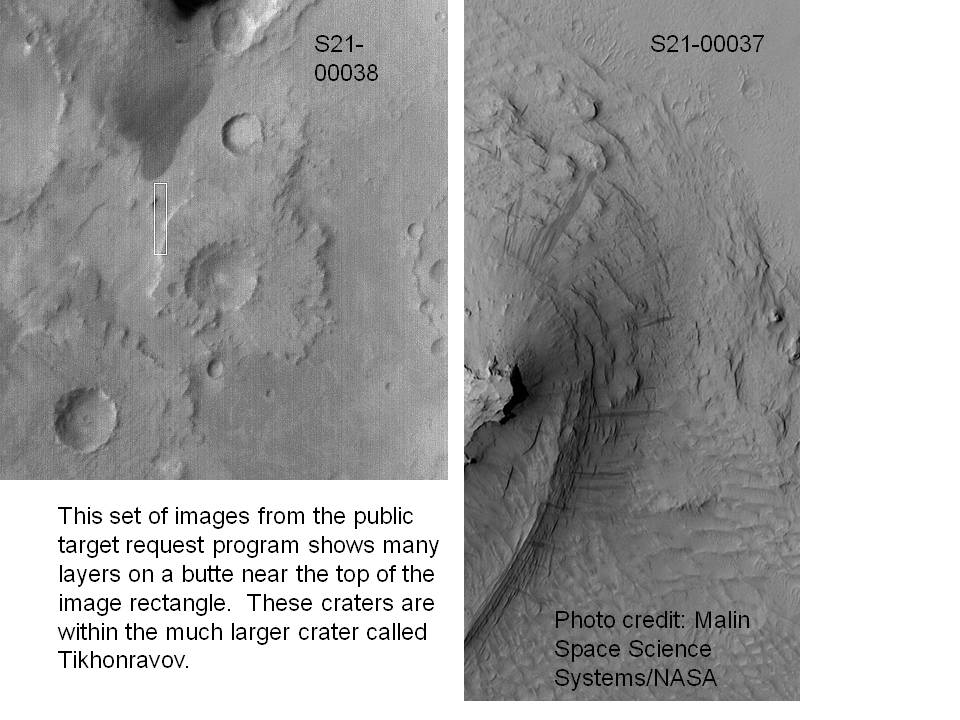
Layers in an old crater in Arabia, as seen by MGS, under the MOC Public Targeting Program. Layers may form from volcanoes, the wind, or by deposition under water. The craters on the left are pedestal craters.

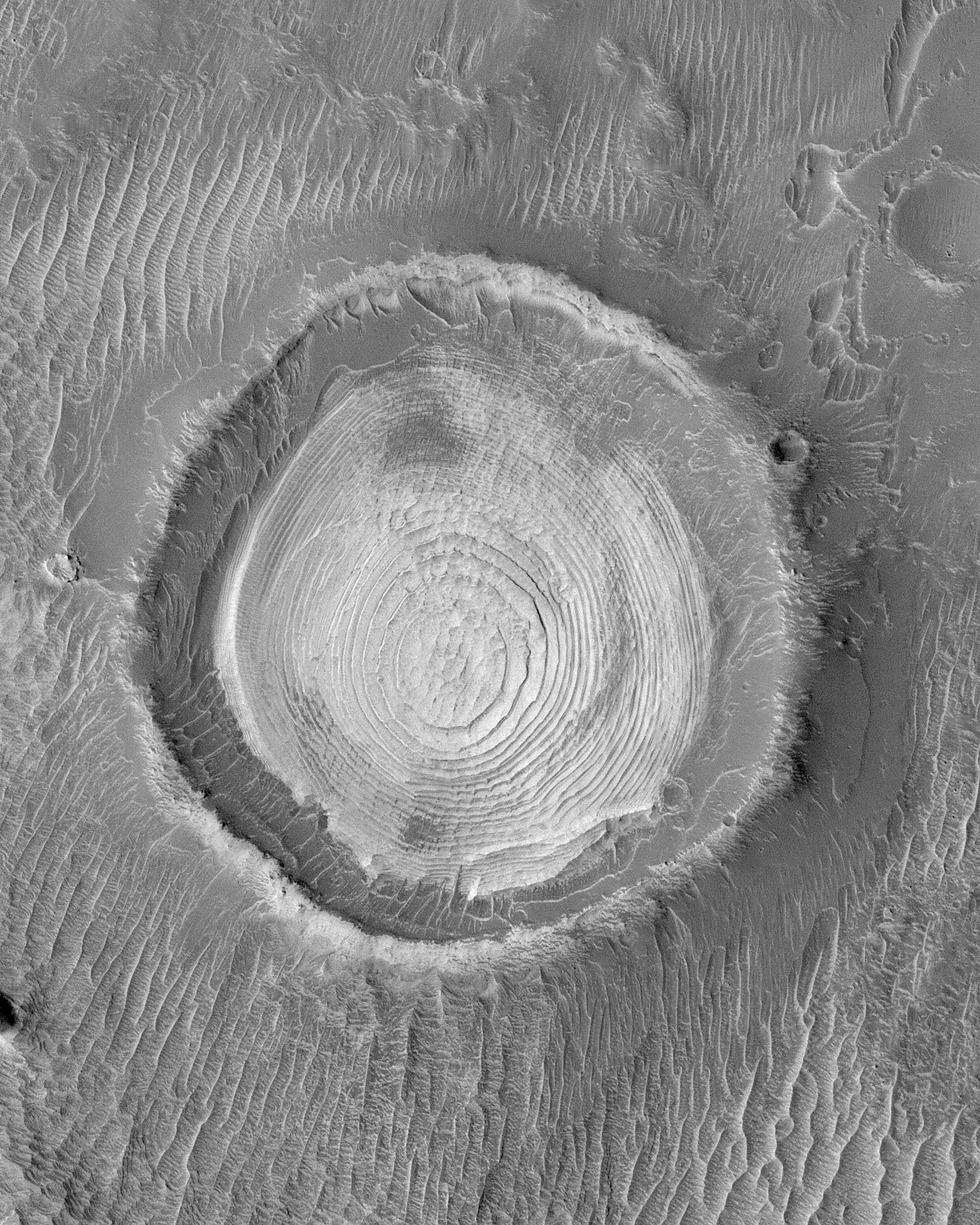
Layers in crater found within the Schiaparelli crater basin as seen by MGS. Image from the Sinus Sabaeus quadrangle.

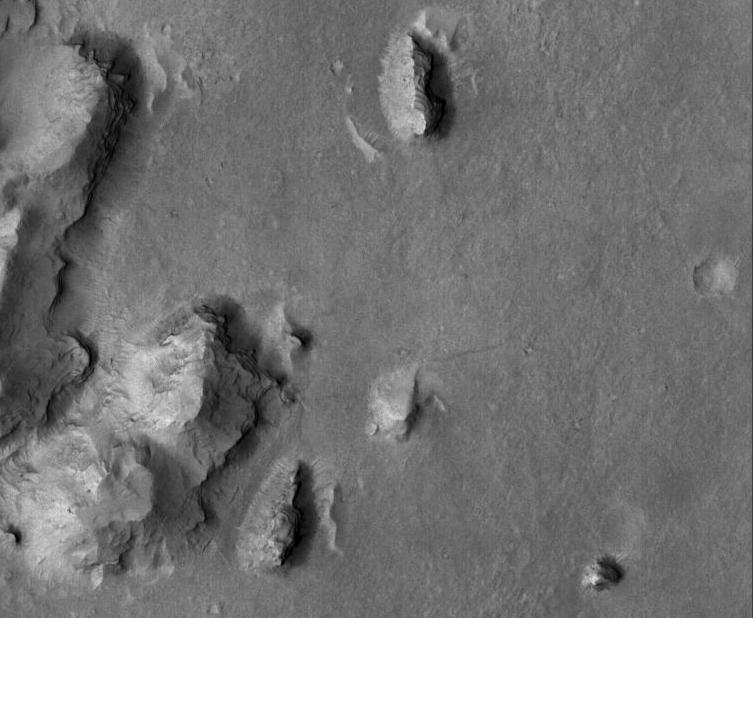
Buttes and layers in Aeolis quadrangle, as seen by MGS.
- The northern hemisphere is probably just as cratered as the southern hemisphere, but the craters are mostly buried.
- Many features, like impact craters, were buried, then recently exhumed.
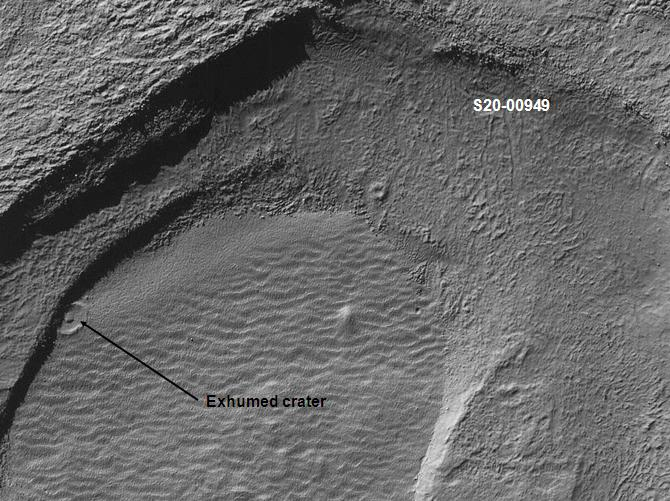
Crater that was buried in another age and is now being exposed by erosion, as seen by the Mars Global Surveyor under the MOC Public Targeting Program. Image is located in the Noachis quadrangle.

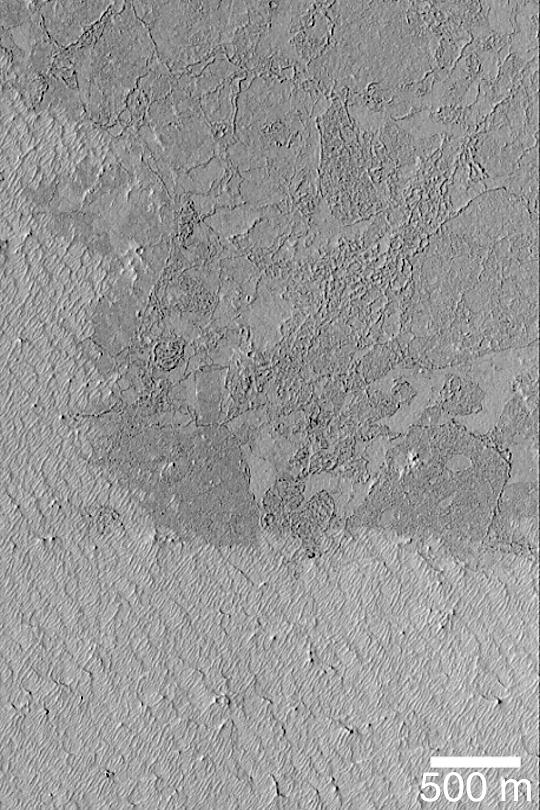
Lava flows were once covered over, now these platy flows are being exposed.

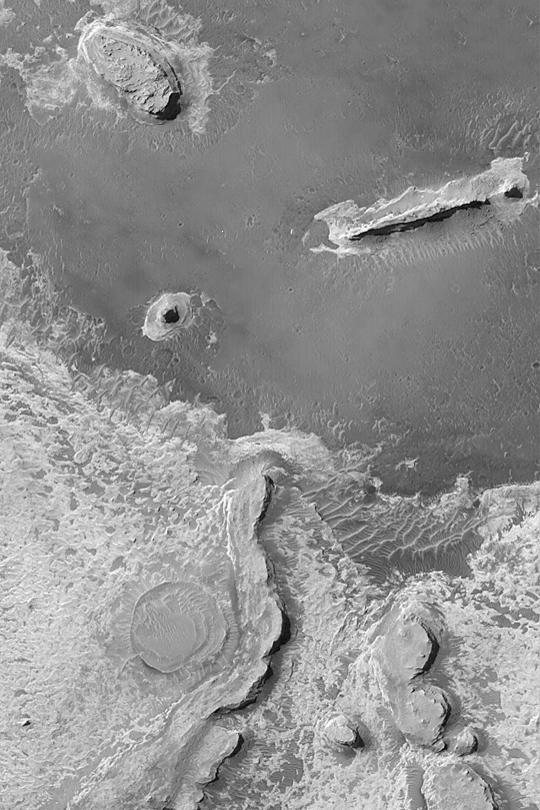
Crater was buried, now it is being exhumed by erosion. Image located in Ismenius Lacus quadrangle.

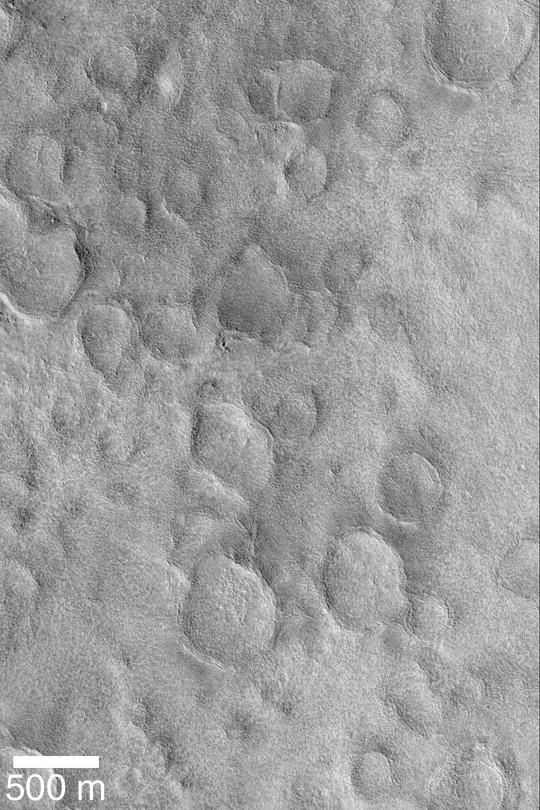
The northern hemisphere appears smooth, but the craters are covered over. Here, a group of craters are partially exposed. Image located in Cebrenia quadrangle.
- Large areas of Mars are covered by a mantle that coats all but the very steepest slopes. The mantle is sometimes smooth, sometimes pitted. Some believe the pits are due to the escape of water through sublimation (ice changing directly to a vapor) of buried ice.
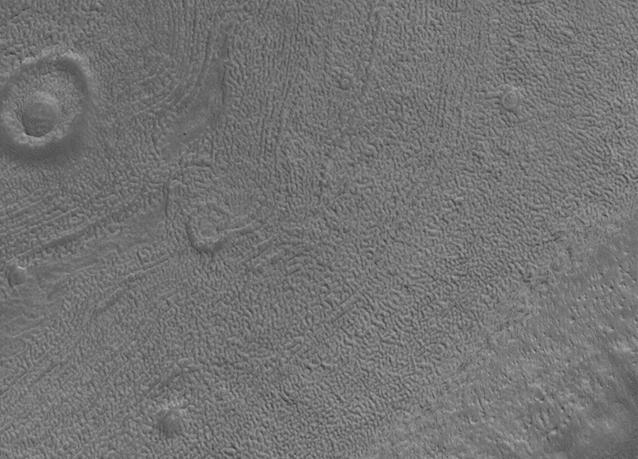
Close up image of Phaethontis surface taken by Mars Global Surveyor, under MOC Public Targeting Program. Pits are thought to be caused by buried ice turning into a gas.

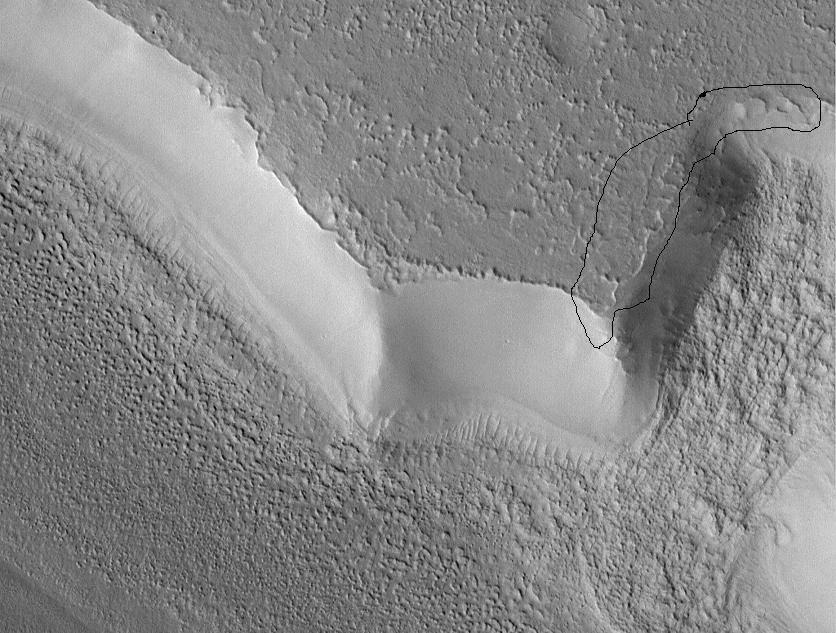
The mantle drapes most of the area. Note the absence of boulders on the cliff face. An area that shows the edges of the mantle is circled. Image located in Ismenius Lacus quadrangle.

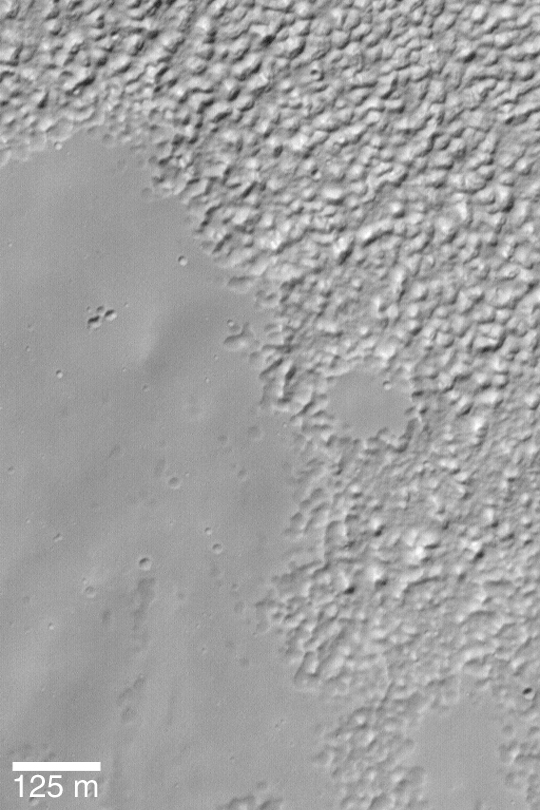
Mantle material, as seen by MGS.

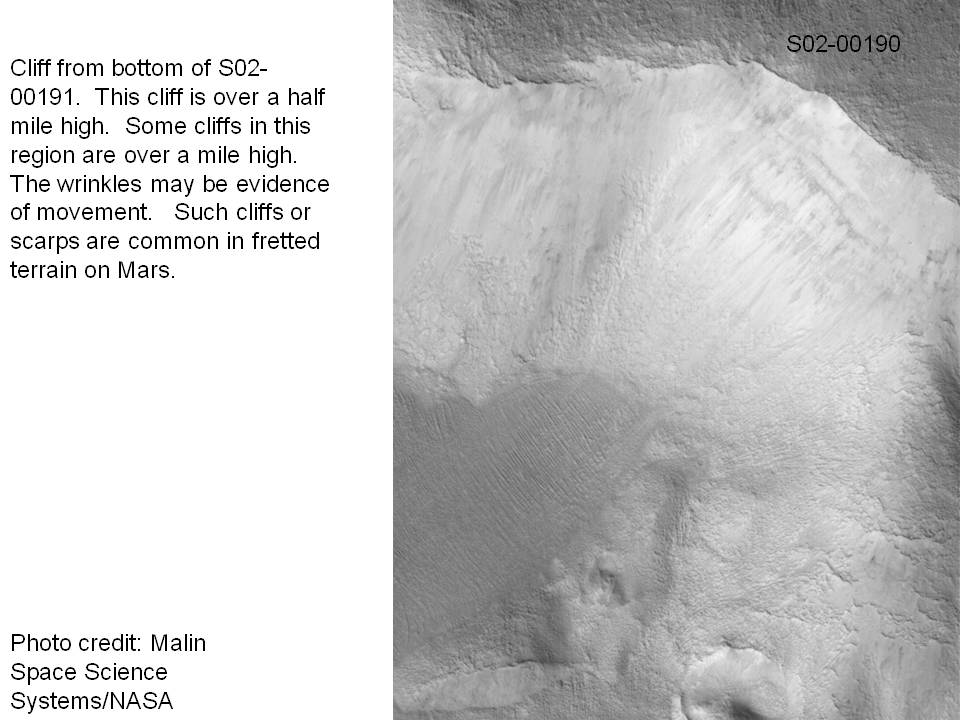
Steep cliff in Ismenius Lacus quadrangle with smooth mantle covering its face. Picture taken under MOC Public Targeting Program.
- Some areas are covered by hematite-rich material. The hematite could have been put in place by liquid water in the past.
- Dark streaks were found to be caused by giant dust devils. Dust devil tracks were observed to frequently change; some changed in just one month.
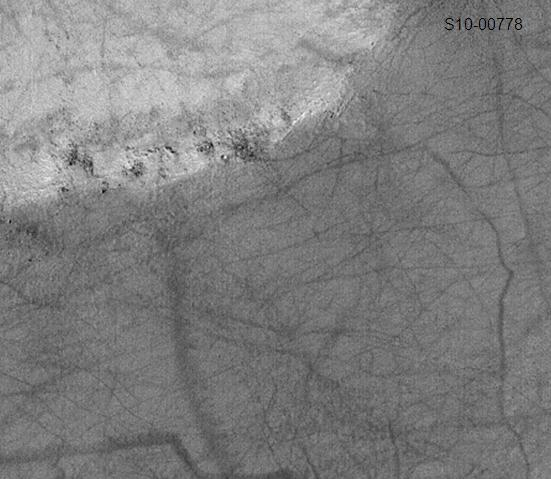
Pattern of large and small tracks made by giant dust devils as seen by Mars Global Surveyor, under the MOC Public Targeting Program. Image is located in Eridania quadrangle.

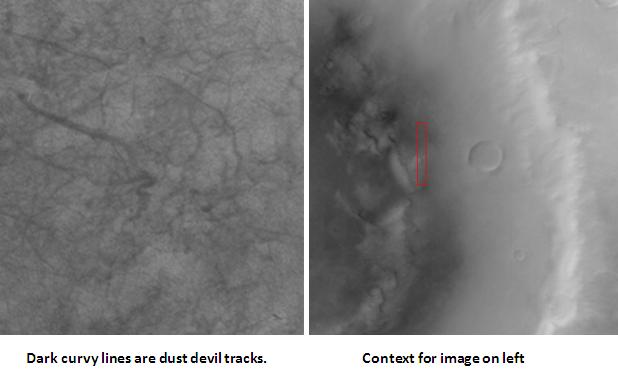
Kepler (Martian crater) showing dust devil tracks, as seen by Mars Global Surveyor. Kepler is a large crater in the Eridania quadrangle.

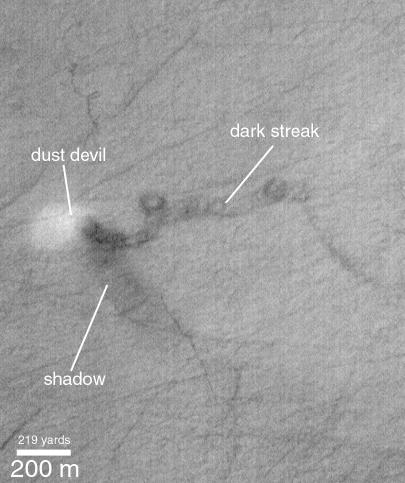
Dust devil, as seen by MGS.

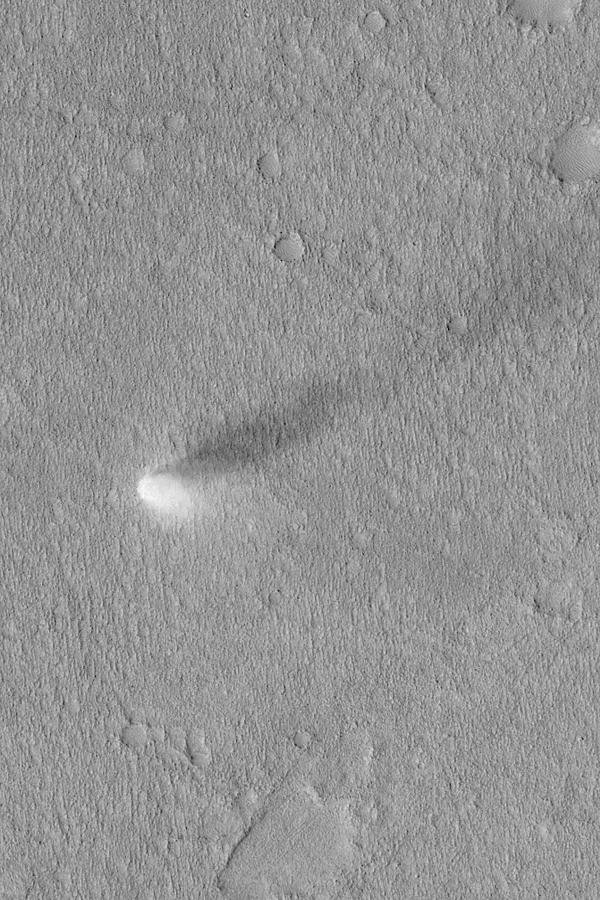
Dust devil in action showing shadow to the right. Image located in Cebrenia quadrangle.
- The south pole's residual cap was observed to look like Swiss cheese, with holes generally a few meters deep. The holes get bigger each year, so this region or hemisphere may be warming. Claims that this represents a global trend, however, are cherry-picking regional data versus the planetary dataset, and MOC results versus TES and radio science (see below).
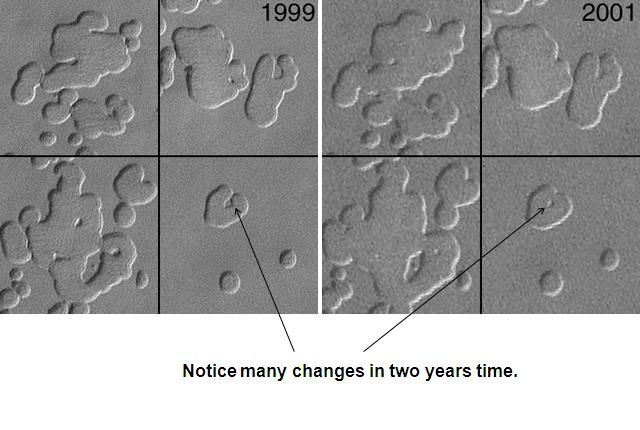
Changes in south pole from 1999 to 2001, as seen by Mars Global Surveyor. Notice how Swiss-cheese type holes have grown in the two years.

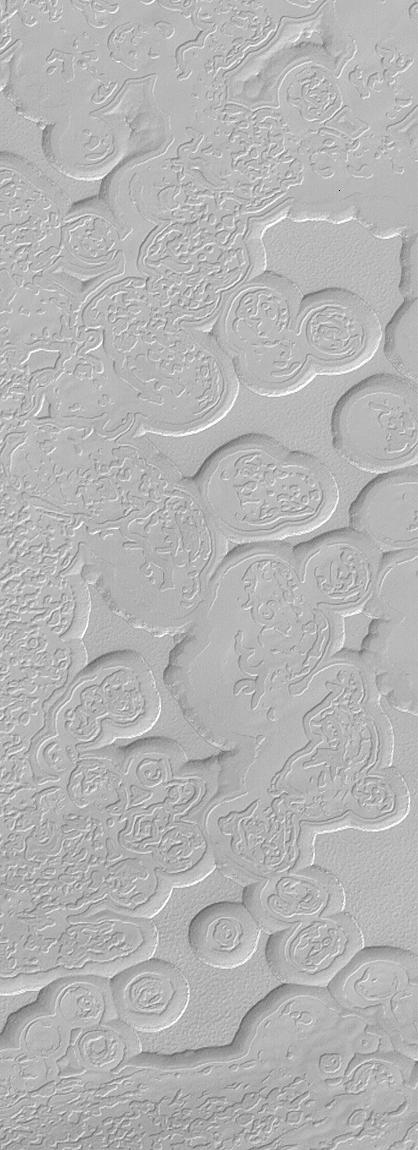
Swiss cheese terrain, as seen by MGS. Largest mesa in image is 4 meters high.

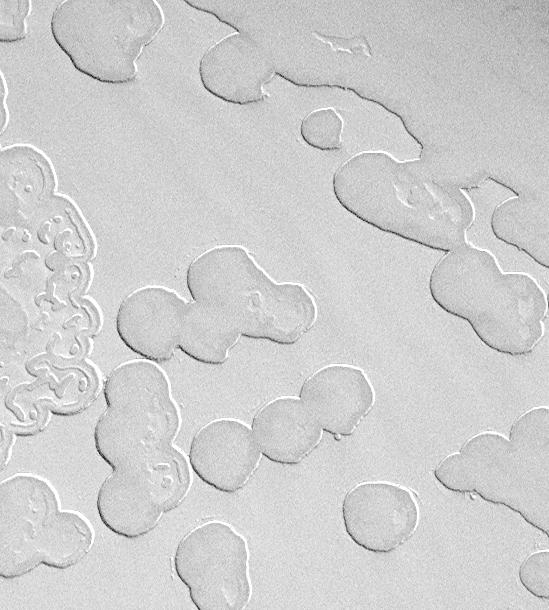
Layers in Swiss cheese terrain. There is a bright upper layer and a darker lower layer.

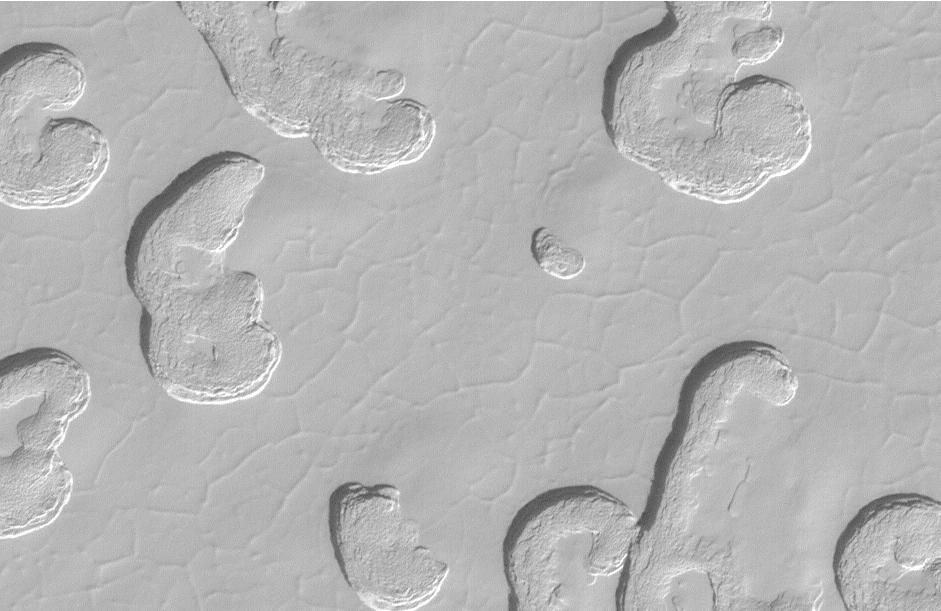
Close-up view of Swiss cheese terrain. Polygonal pattern was probably formed by shallow troughs.
- The Thermal Emission Spectrometer observed in infrared for atmospheric studies and mineralogy. TES found that Mars's planetary climate has cooled since the Viking mission, and almost all of the surface of Mars is covered with volcanic rock.
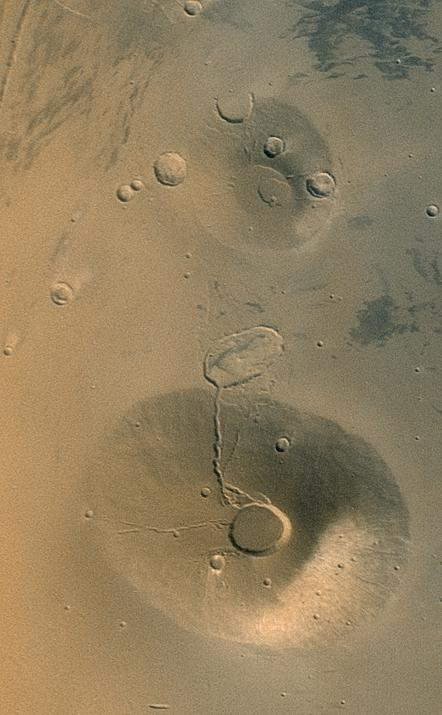
Ceraunius Tholus, one of many volcanoes found on Mars.

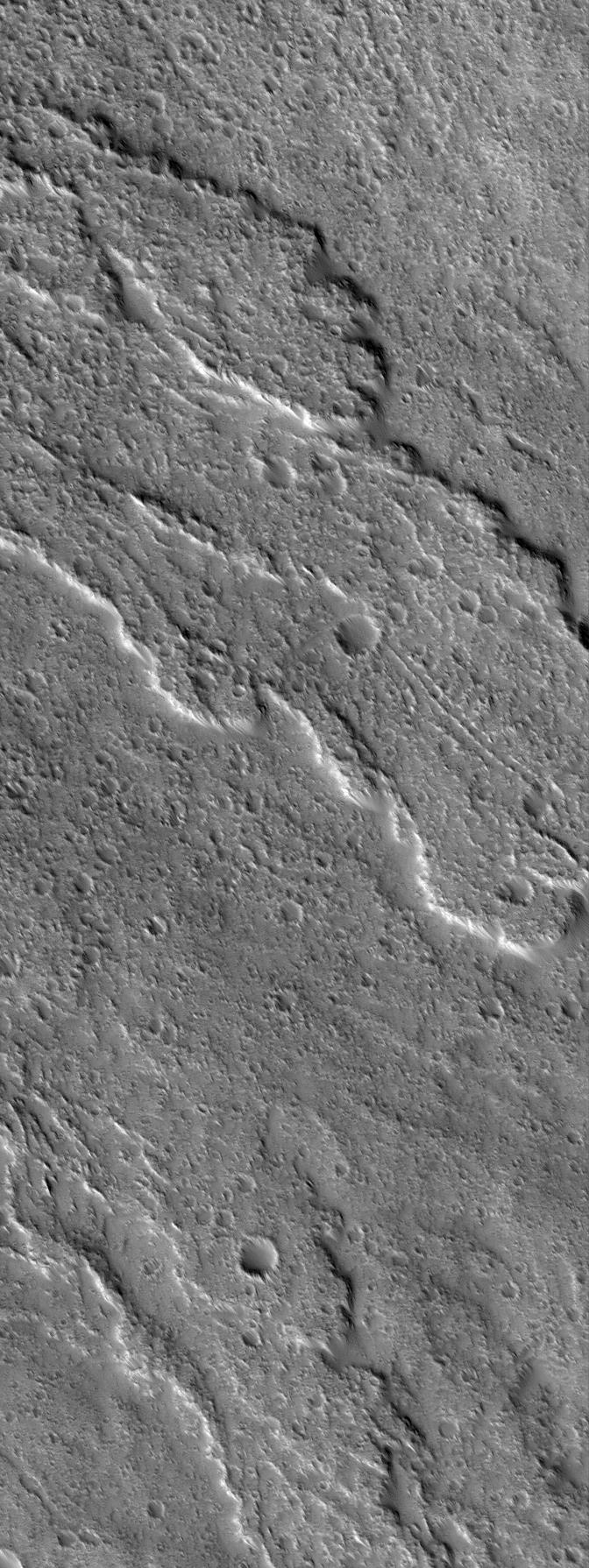
Lava flows in the Tharsis quadrangle.

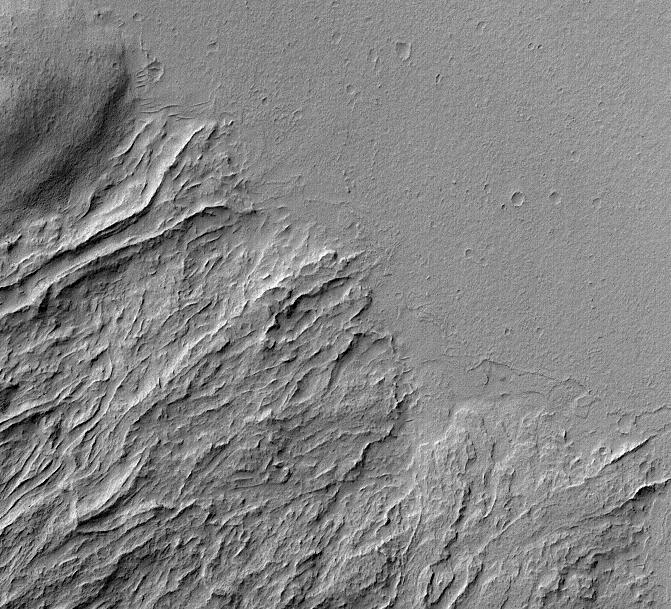
Image shows both young and old lava flows from the base of Olympus Mons. The flat plain is the younger flow. The older flow has channels with levees along their edges. The presence of levees is quite common in many lava flows.

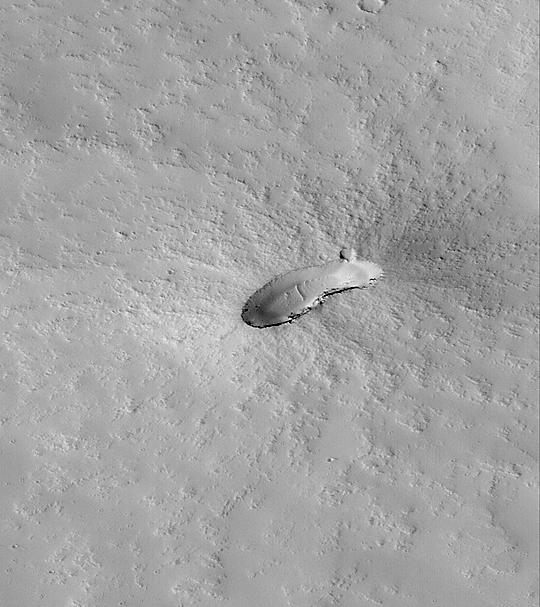
Small volcano in Phoenicis Lacus quadrangle. Image covers a distance 1.9 mi (3.1 km) long.
- Hundreds of house-sized boulders were found in some areas. This indicates that some materials are strong enough to hold together, even when moving downslope. Most of the boulders appeared in volcanic regions so they were probably formed from weathered lava flows.
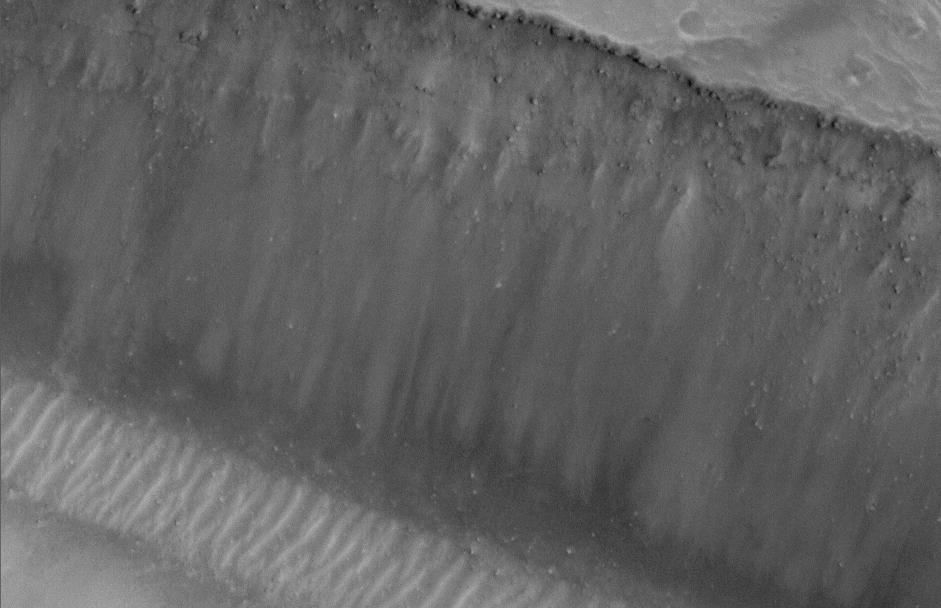
House-sized boulders are scattered throughout this image.

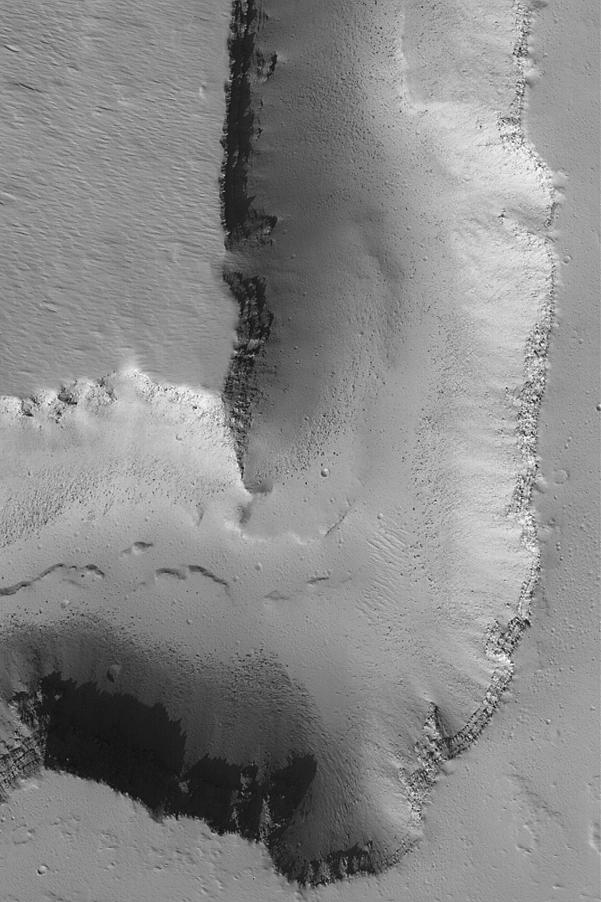
These boulders are near Ascraeus Mons, a Martian volcano. Volcanoes on Mars probably form hard boulders made up of basalt that is resistant to erosion in the current environment of Mars.
- Thousands of dark slope streaks were observed. Most scientists believe they result from the avalanching of dust. However, some researchers think that water may be involved.
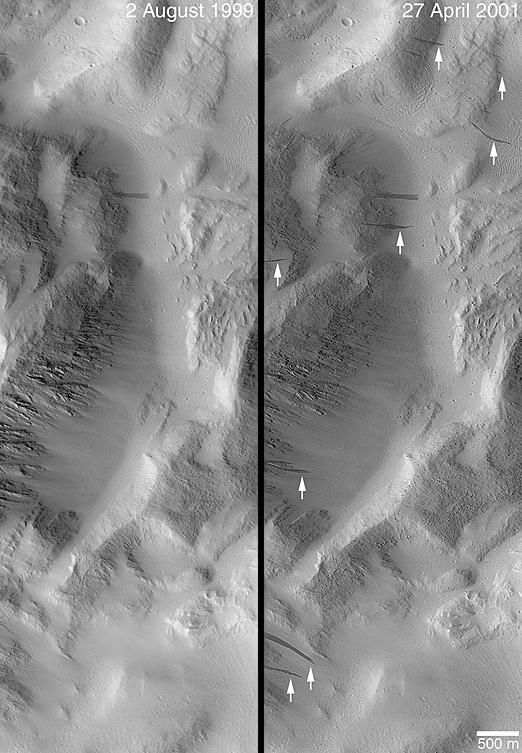
Many streaks underwent changes during the many years that MGS functioned.

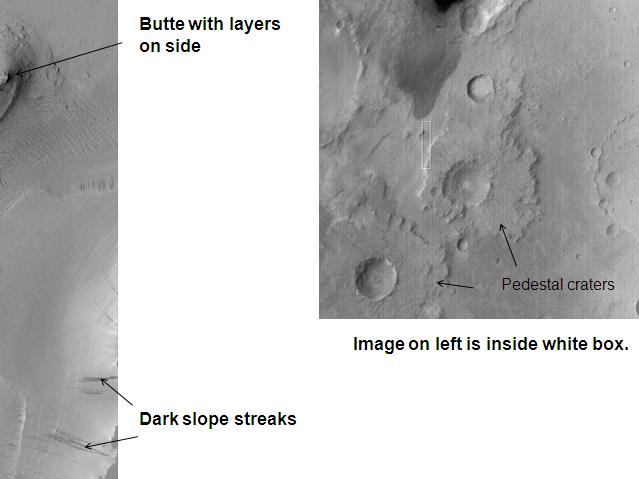
Tikhonravov Crater floor, as seen by Mars Global Surveyor. Click on image to see dark slope streaks and layers. Tikhonravov Crater is in the Arabia quadrangle.

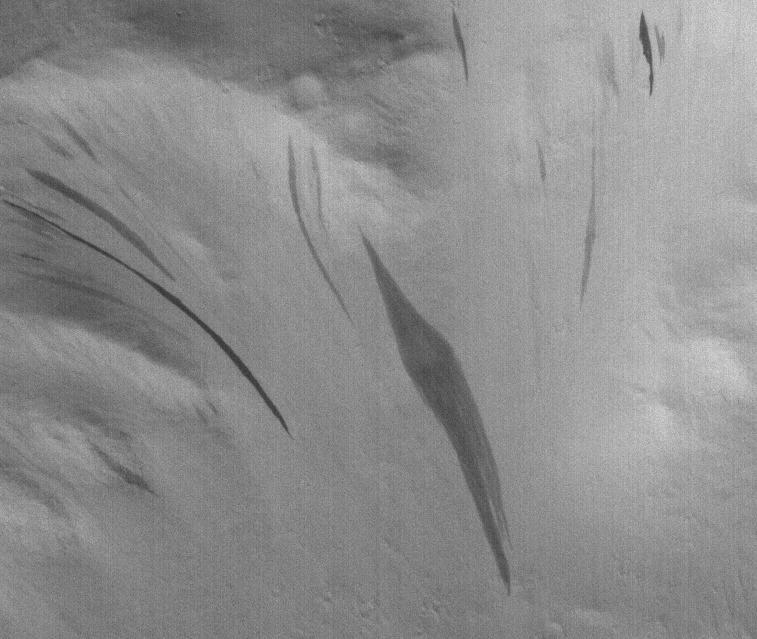
Dark streaks in Diacria quadrangle, as seen by Mars Global Surveyor, under the MOC Public Targeting Program.

=== The Lense–Thirring test ===
Data from MGS have been used to perform a test of the general relativistic Lense–Thirring precession which consists of a small precession of the orbital plane of a test particle moving around a central, rotating mass such as a planet. The interpretation of these results has been debated.

=== Further evidence for water on Mars ===
Hundreds of gullies were discovered that were formed from liquid water, possibly in recent times.

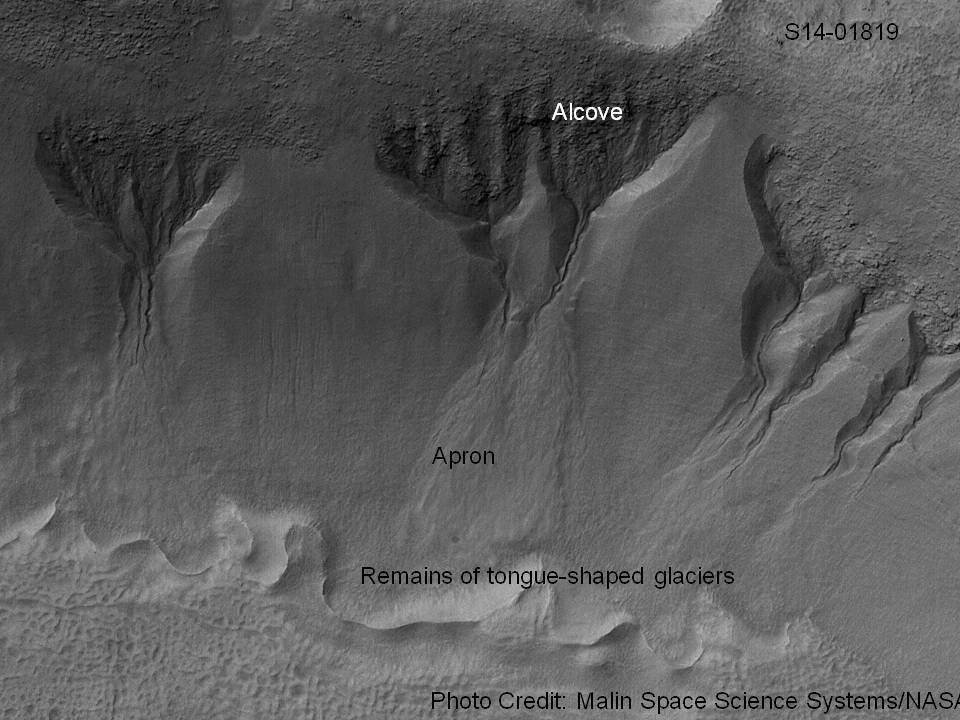
Group of gullies on north wall of crater that lies west of the crater Newton (41.3047 degrees south latitude, 192.89 east longitude). Image taken by Mars Global Surveyor, MOC Public Targeting Program. Image is located in the Phaethontis quadrangle.

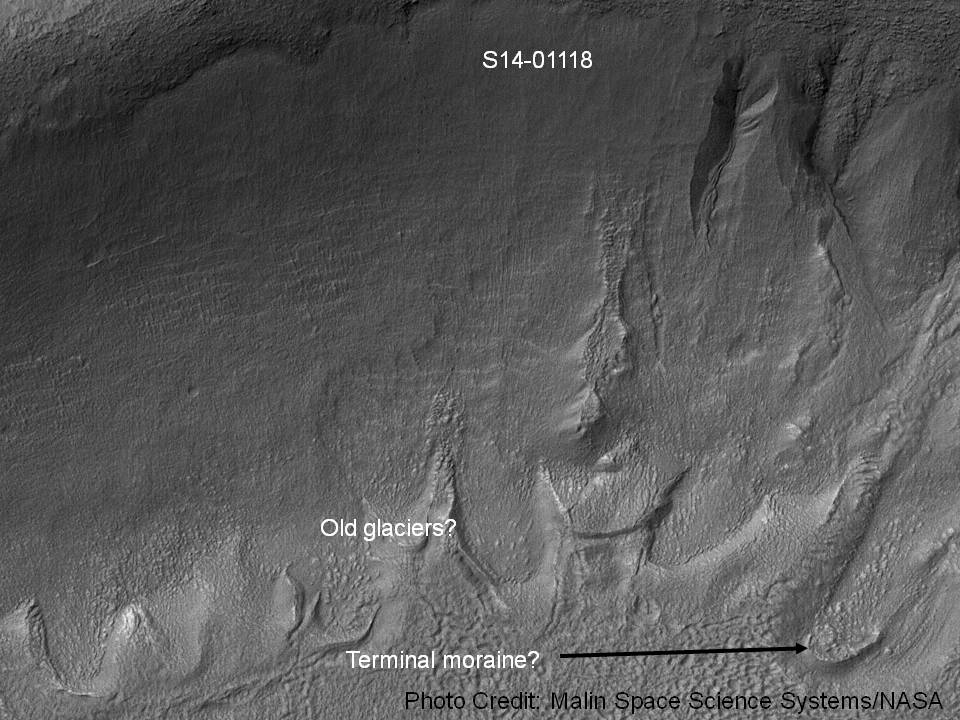
Gullies in a crater in Eridania quadrangle, north of the large crater Kepler. Also, features that may be remains of old glaciers are present. One, to the right, has the shape of a tongue. Picture taken under the MOC Public Targeting Program.

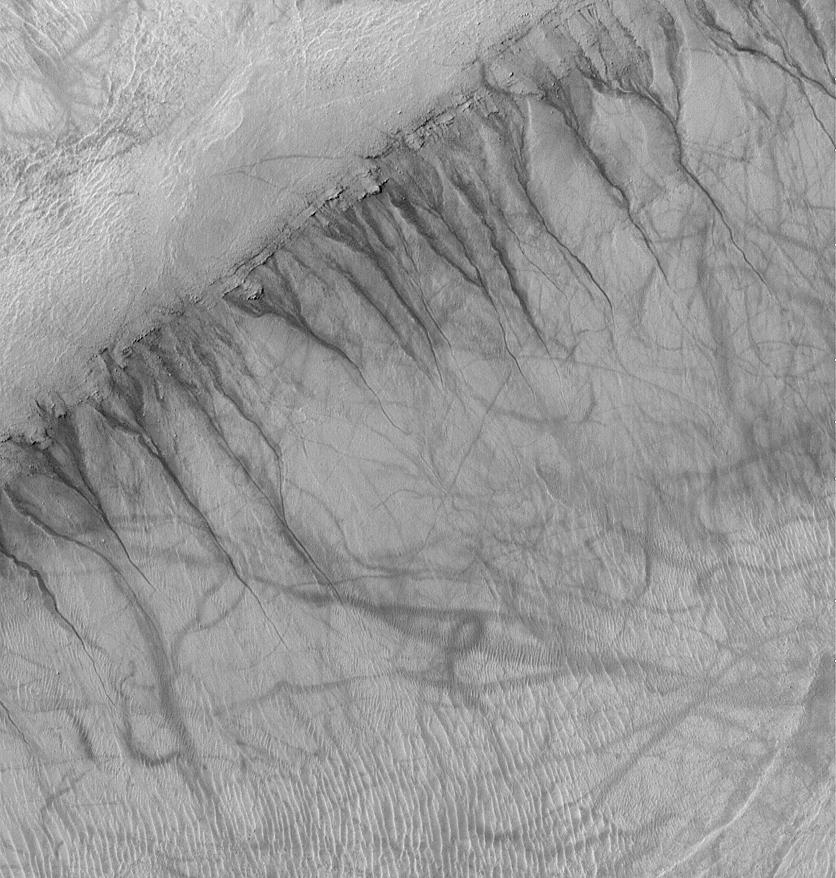
Gullies on one wall of Kaiser Crater. Gullies usually are found in only one wall of a crater.

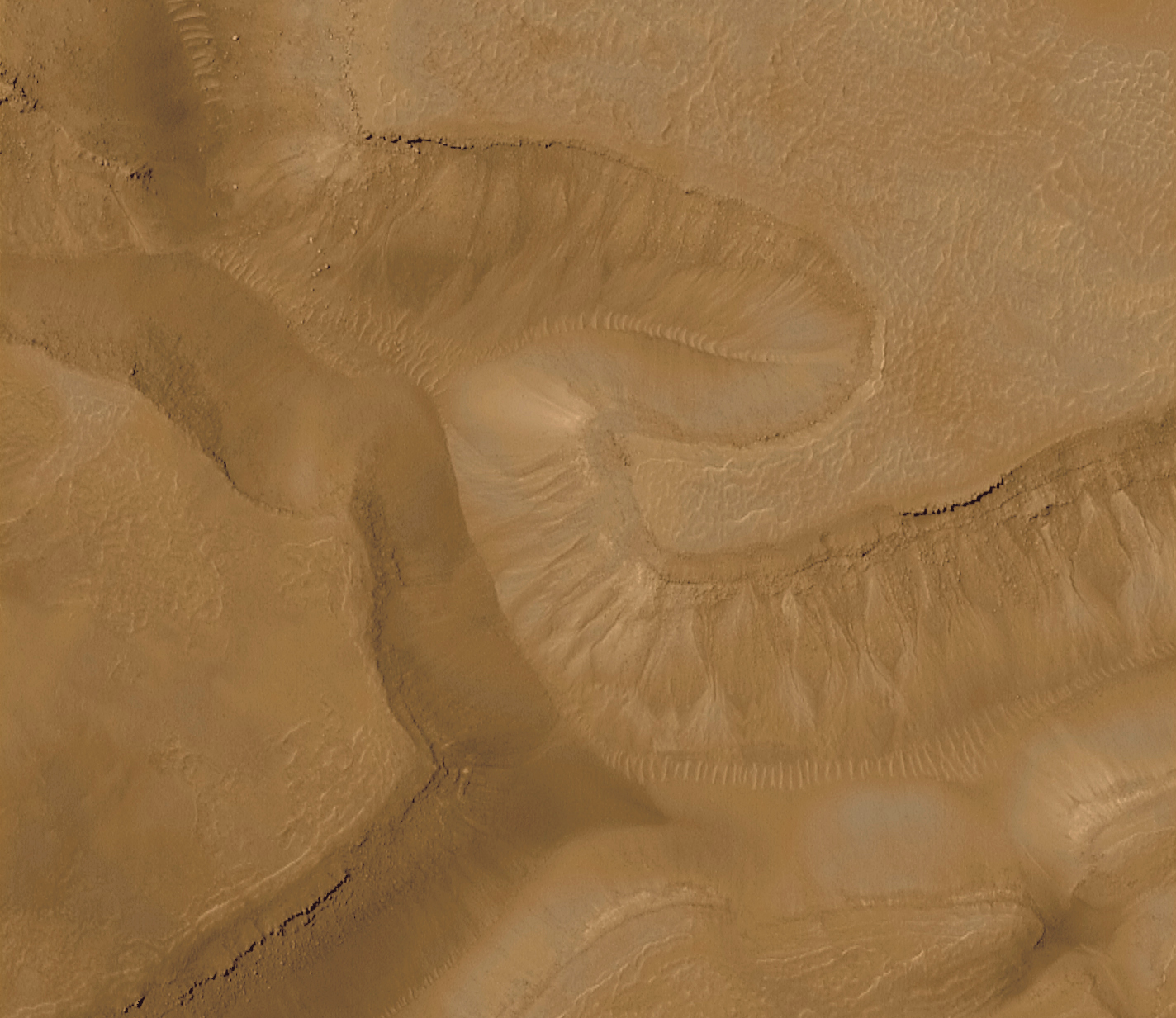
Full color image of gullies on wall of Gorgonum Chaos. Image is located in the Phaethontis quadrangle.

A few channels on Mars displayed inner channels that suggest sustained fluid flows. The most well-known is the one in Nanedi Valles. Another was found in Nirgal Vallis.

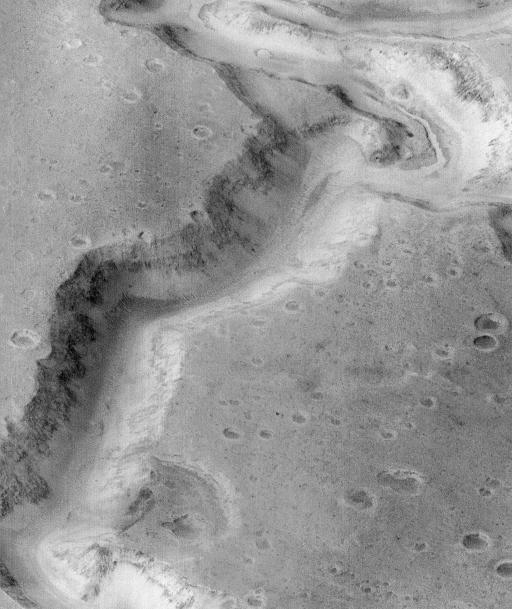
Inner channel on floor of Nanedi Valles that suggests that water flowed for a fairly long period. Image from Lunae Palus quadrangle

On 6 December 2006 NASA released photos of two craters in Terra Sirenum and Centauri Montes which appear to show the presence of flowing water on Mars at some point between 1999 and 2001. The pictures were produced by Mars Global Surveyor and are quite possibly the spacecraft's final contribution to our knowledge of Mars and the question of whether water exists on the planet.

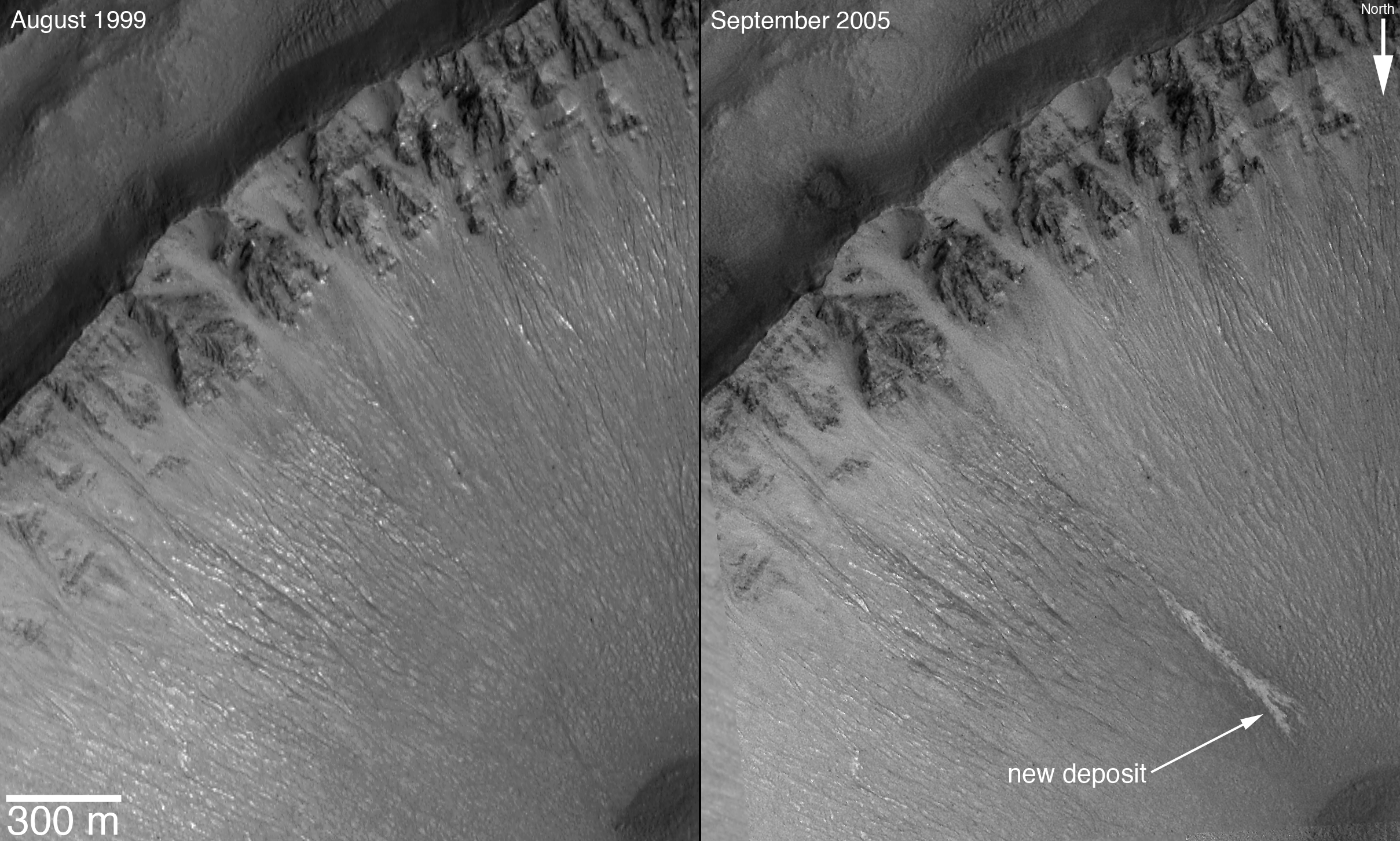
Evidence of possible recent water flow

== Gallery ==
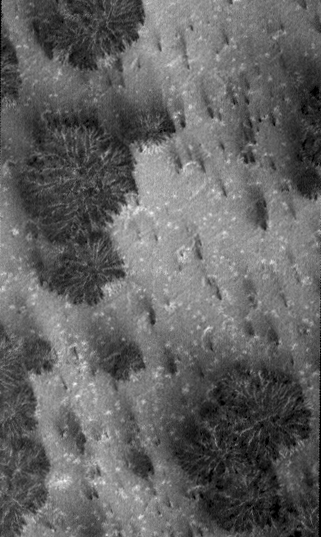
Image of possible CO_{2} geysers, taken by Mars Global Surveyor and released on 16 October 2000.

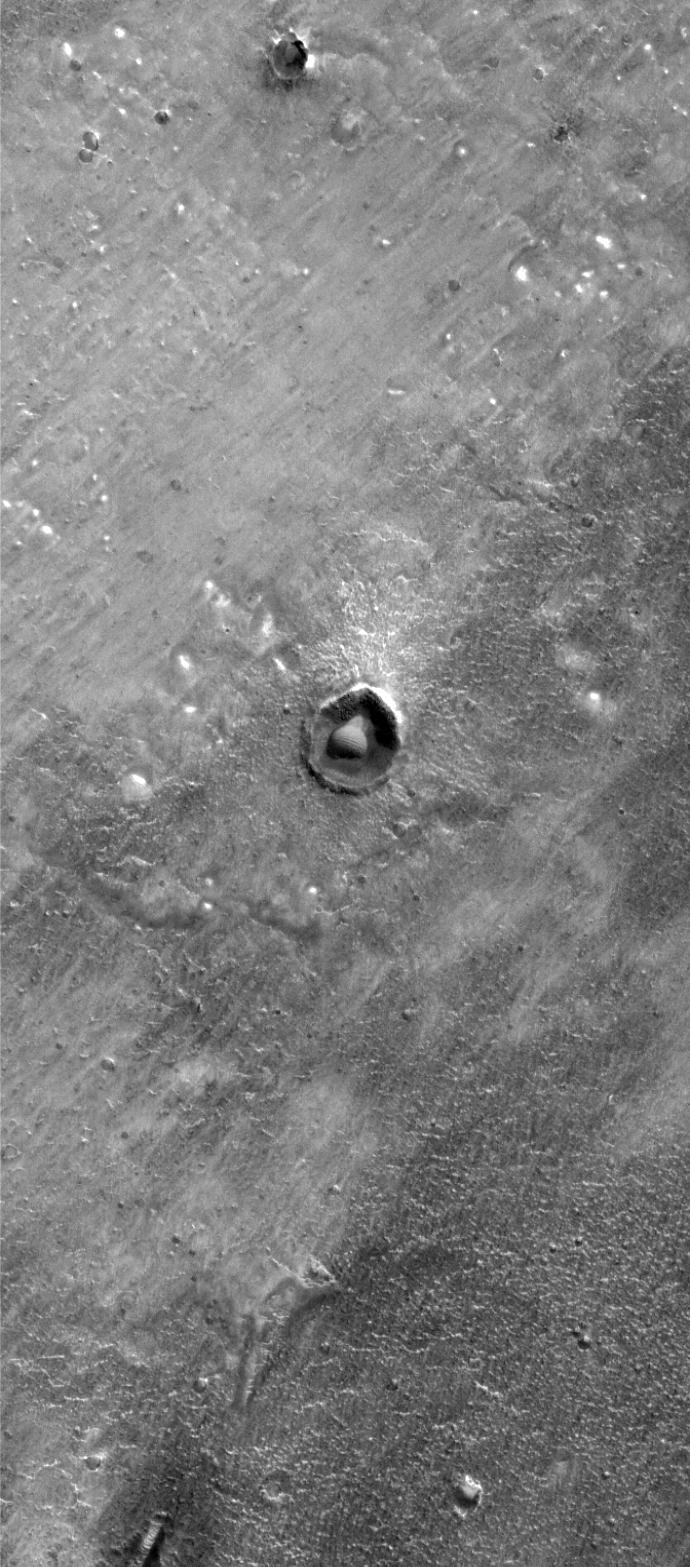
Surface of Mars taken by Mars Global Surveyor.

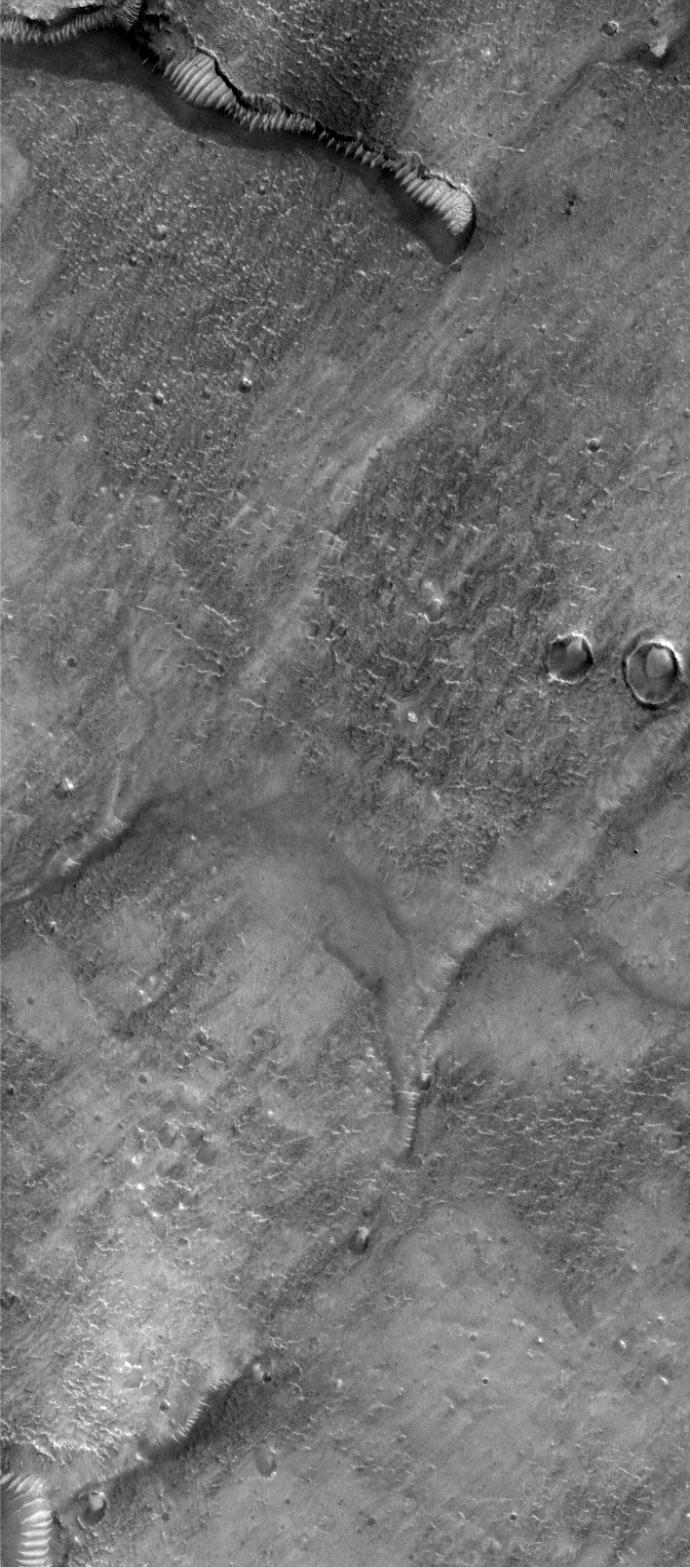
Surface of Mars taken by Mars Global Surveyor.

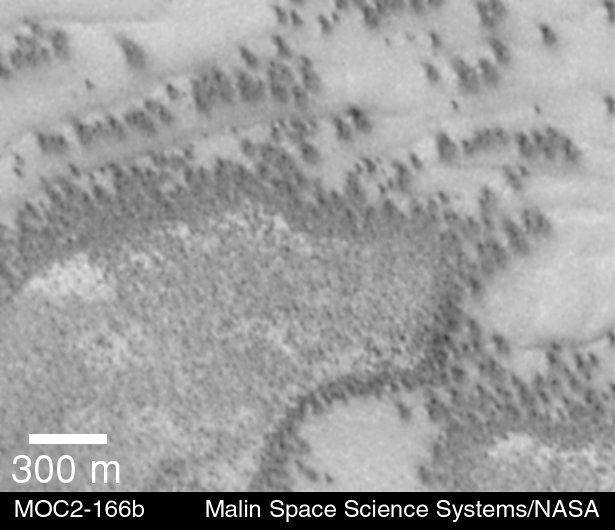
Surface of Mars taken by Mars Global Surveyor on 10 August 1999.

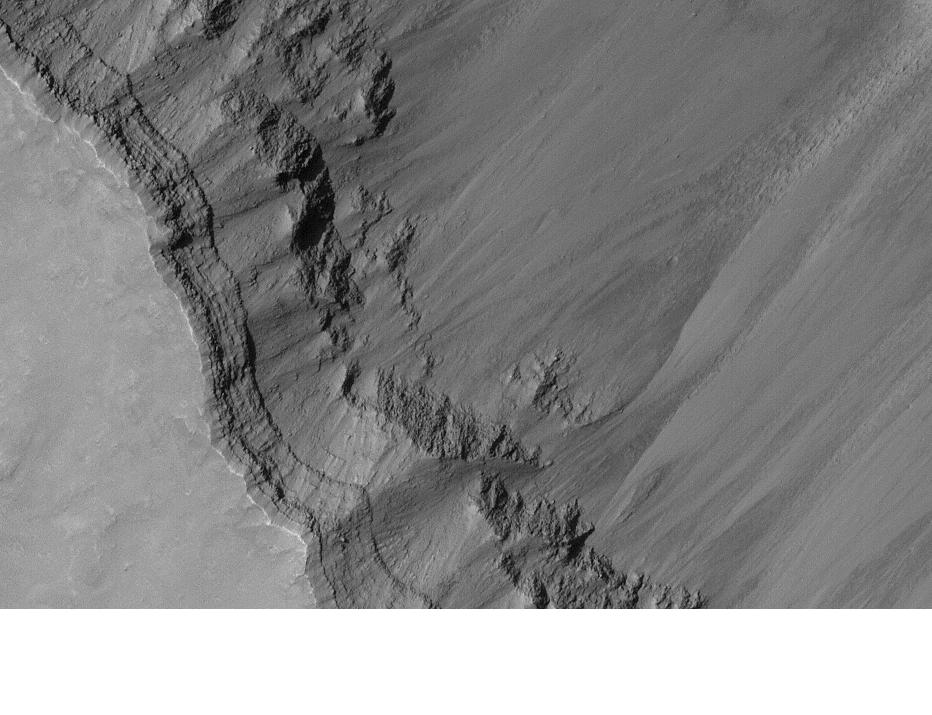
Layers in the canyon wall in Coprates quadrangle, as seen by Mars Global Surveyor, under MOC Public Targeting Program.

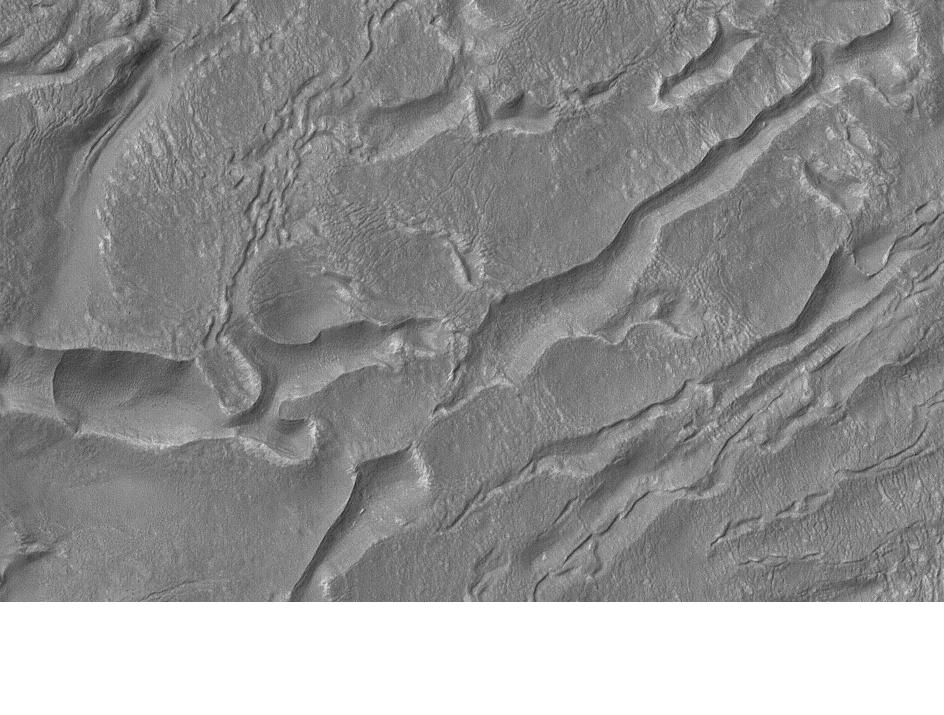
Banded or taffy-pull terrain in Hellas, as seen by Mars Global Surveyor. Origin is unknown at present.

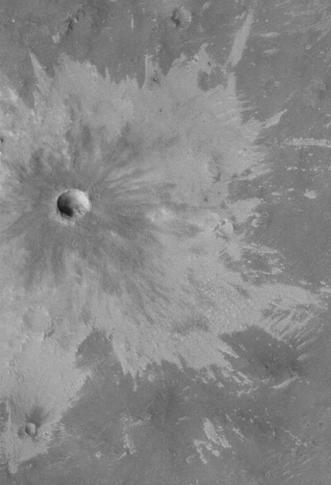
Bright rays caused by impact throwing out a bright lower layer. Some bright layers contain hydrated minerals. Picture taken by Mars Global Surveyor. Location is Memnonia quadrangle.

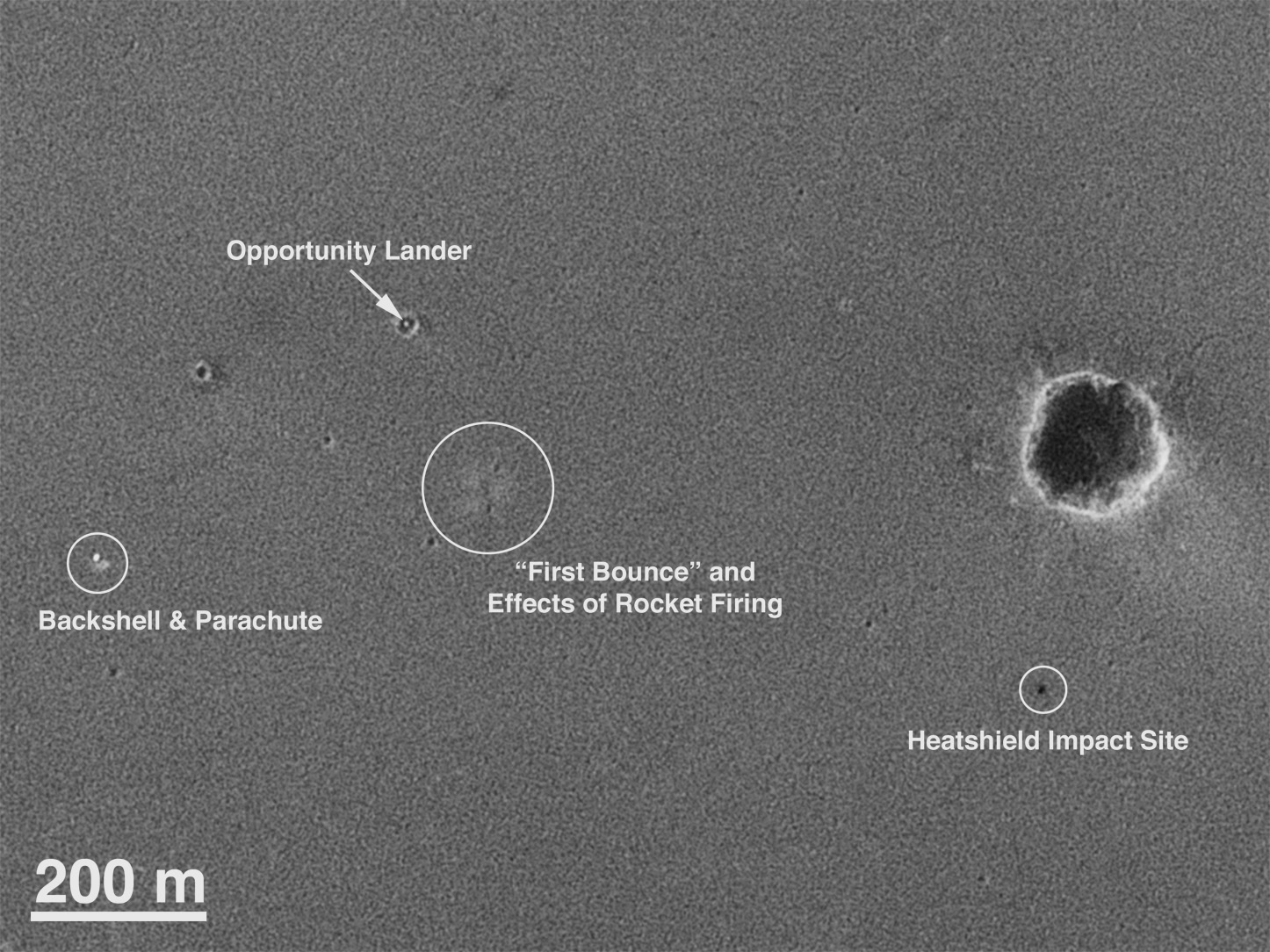
Mars Global Surveyor photograph of Opportunity rover's landing site showing "hole in one."

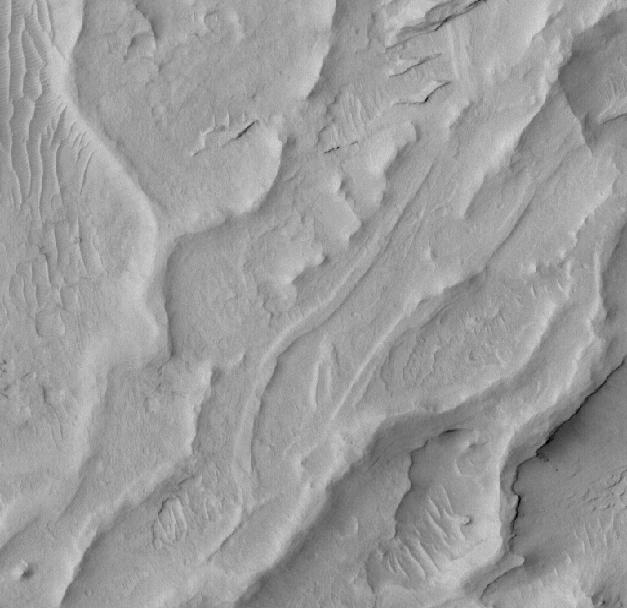
Inverted channels in Aeolis quadrangle. It is believed that stream channels became raised features after coarse materials were deposited and cemented.

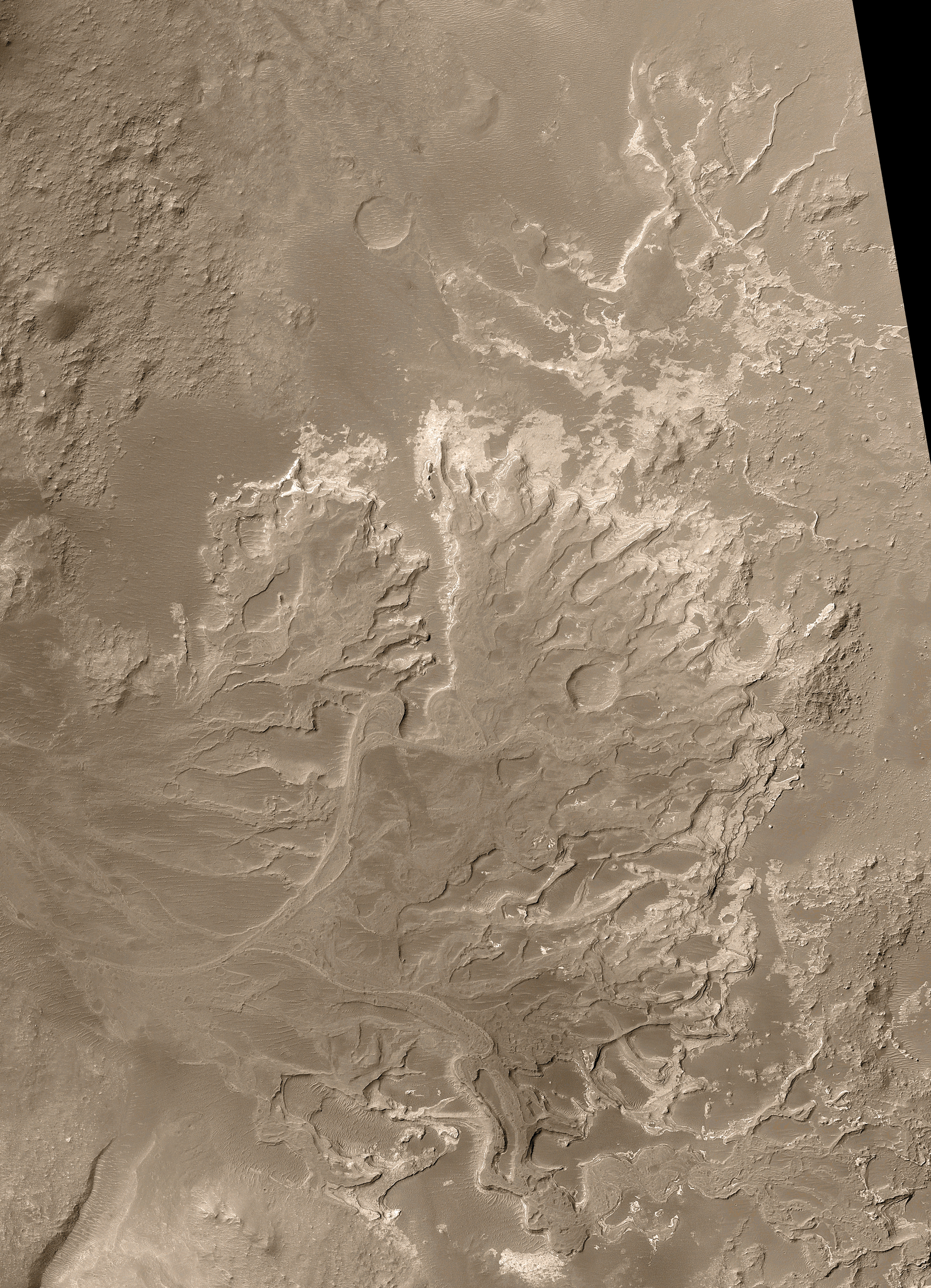
Delta within Eberswalde crater. The area is of great interest to geologists. Evidence of past microbial life may be found in this location.

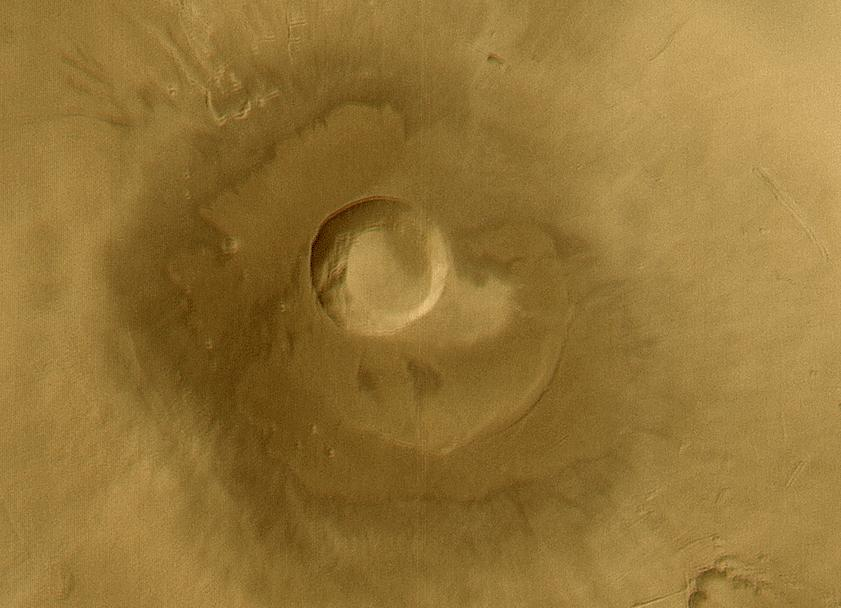
Pavonis Mons, located on the equator in Tharsis quadrangle.

== See also ==
- 2001 Mars Odyssey, NASA orbiter studying the geology and hydrology of Mars
- Exploration of Mars
- List of Mars orbiters
- List of missions to Mars
- Mars Express, European Mars orbiter
- Mars Orbiter Mission – Indian orbiter mission to Mars (2013–2022)
- Mars Reconnaissance Orbiter, NASA Mars orbiter launched in 2005, still operational
- MAVEN – NASA Mars orbiter (2013–2025)
- Phobos monolith – Rock on Phobos
- Robotic spacecraft – Spacecraft without people on board
- Space exploration – Investigation of outer space
- List of software bugs
