= Mars Orbiter Camera =

Scientific instruments on board the Mars Observer and Mars Global Surveyor spacecraft

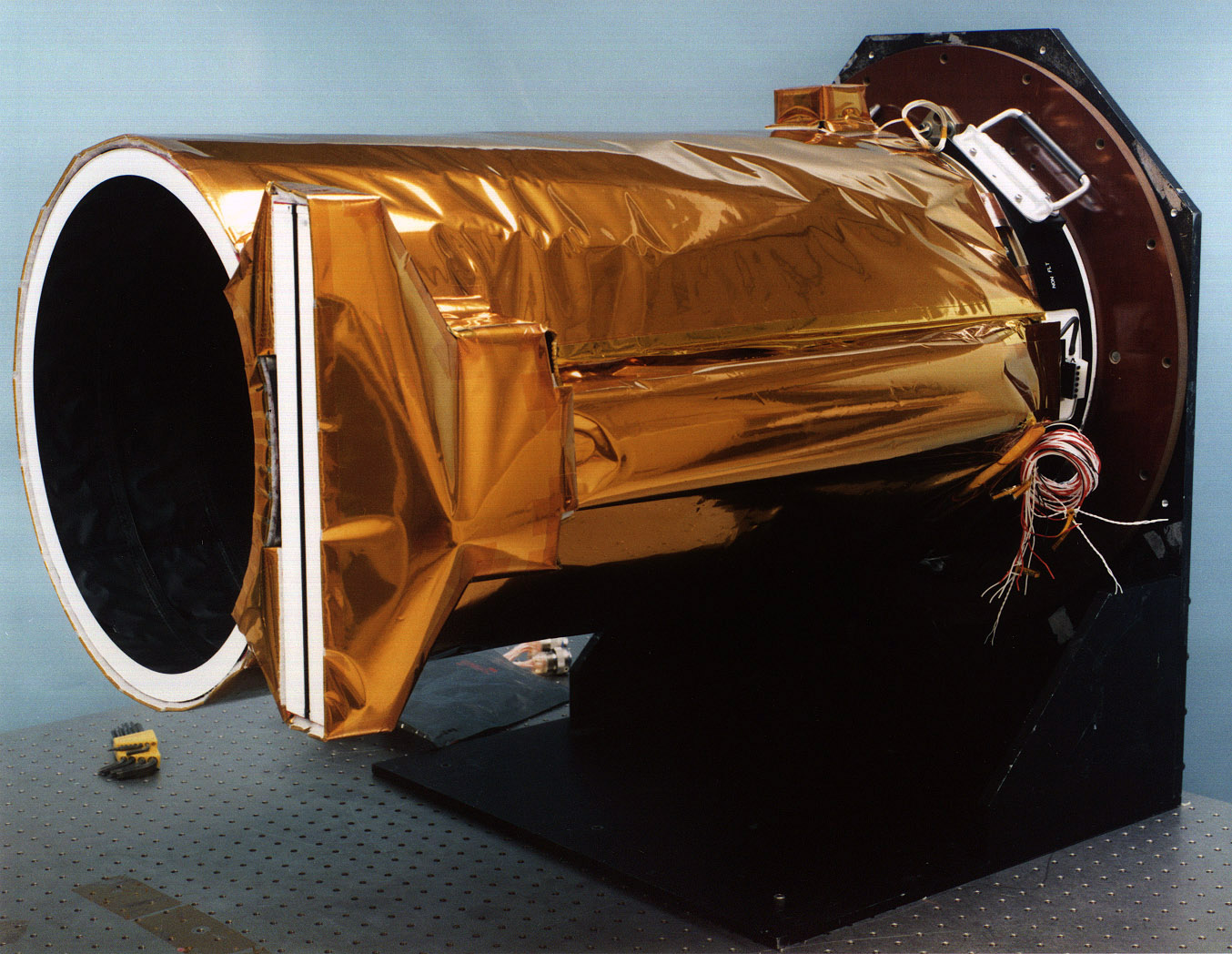
The Mars Orbiter Camera was in orbit around Mars between 1997 and 2006 (narrow-angle camera inside the cylinder, the two wide-angle cameras attached on the front area)

The Mars Orbiter Camera and Mars Observer Camera (MOC) were scientific instruments on board the Mars Observer and Mars Global Surveyor spacecraft. The camera was built by Malin Space Science Systems (MSSS) for NASA and the cost of the whole MOC scientific investigation project was about US$44 million, higher than anticipated in the budget.

== Design ==
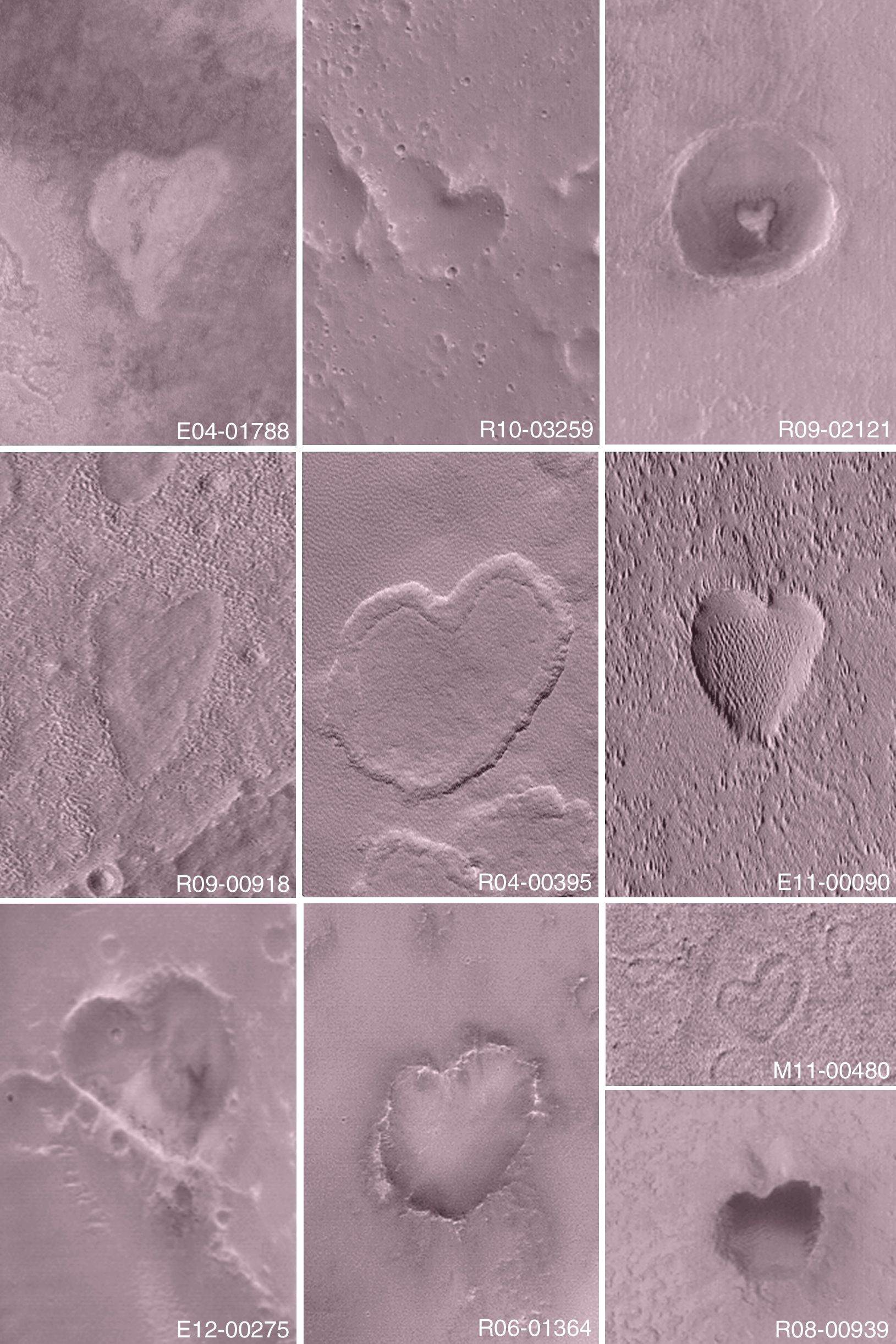
Heart-shaped features on Mars (MGS, MOC, February 14, 2004).

Originally named Mars Observer Camera, it was selected by NASA in 1986 for the Mars Observer mission, but it returned only three images of planet Mars before the loss of the spacecraft in 1993. A second camera of the same specifications, renamed to Mars Orbiter Camera (MOC), was built (with assistance by California Institute of Technology) and launched on board the Mars Global Surveyor (MGS) spacecraft in 1996. The camera returned 243,668 images while in orbit around Mars, before the loss of the MGS spacecraft in 2006. Mars Orbiter Camera was operated by its manufacturer, Malin Space Science Systems, from its facilities in San Diego, California.

The scientific instrument consisted of three elements: a black-and-white narrow-angle camera with a spatial resolution of 1.4 metres per pixel (from an altitude of 378 km), and two pushbroom wide-angle cameras (one red, the other blue) with resolution capabilities spanning 230 m per pixel to 7.5 km/pixel. The narrow-angle camera provided 97,097 (roughly 40%) of the 243,668 images returned by Mars Orbiter Camera.

The narrow-angle camera was placed inside an 80 cm-long cylinder with a diameter of 40 cm, and the two wide-angle cameras were attached above the cylinder's front area. All cameras were based on CCD technology and were supported by state-of-the-art 1980s electronics, including a 32-bit radiation-hardened 10 MHz processor (capable of 1 million instructions per second) and 12 MB of DRAM memory buffer.

In addition to taking images, the MOC instrument's 12 MB memory buffer serviced the Mars Global Surveyor's Mars Relay antenna as temporary data storage for communications between Earth and landed spacecraft on Mars. For example, more than 7.6 terabits of data were transferred to and from the Mars Exploration Rovers (Spirit and Opportunity). The camera also enabled NASA scientists to choose suitable landing sites for other exploration missions.

== Images ==
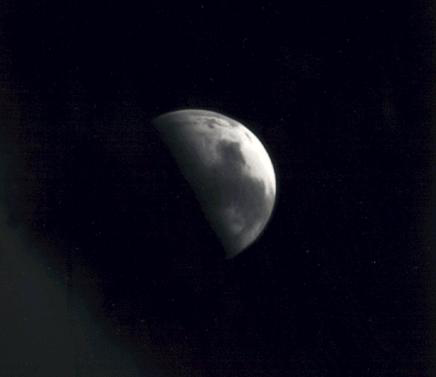
Mars Observer Camera view of Mars, before contact was lost

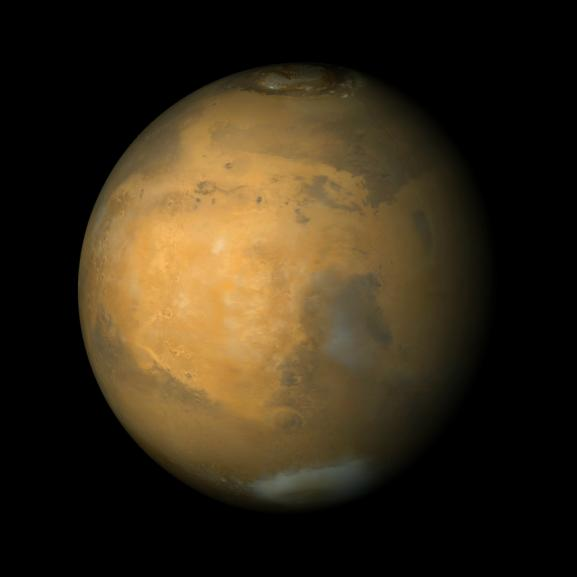
Mars Orbiter Camera view of Mars in enhanced color, centered on Arabia Terra (the bright area)

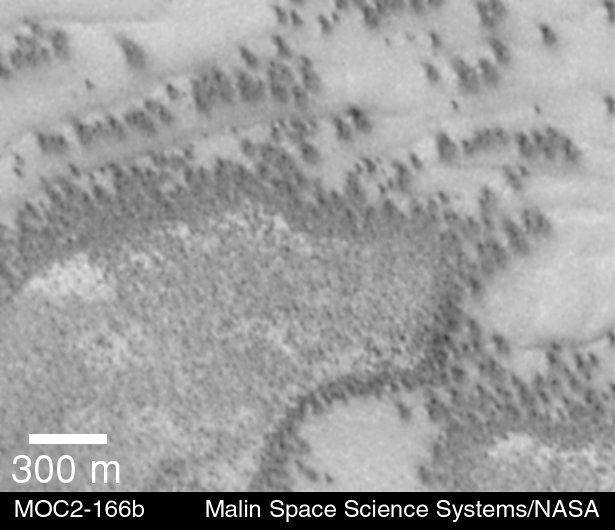
Mars Orbiter Camera picture taken on 21 July 1999 showing Mars's polar dunes

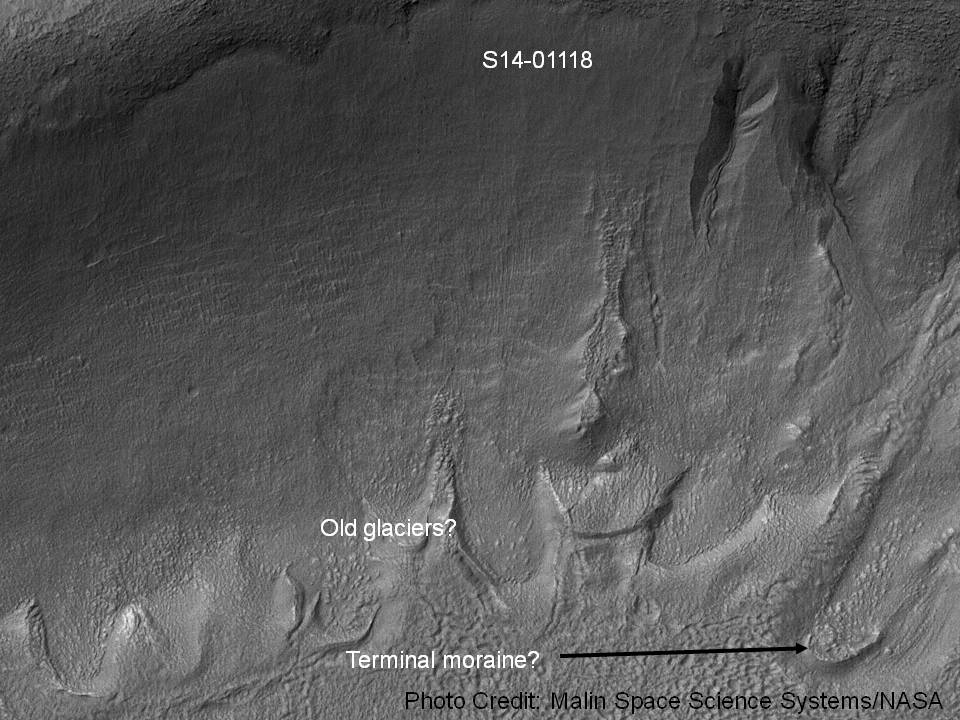
Gullies in a crater in Eridania, north of the large crater Kepler. Also, features that may be remains of old glaciers are present. One, to the right, has the shape of a tongue. Image taken with Mars Global Surveyor, under the MOC Public Targeting Program.

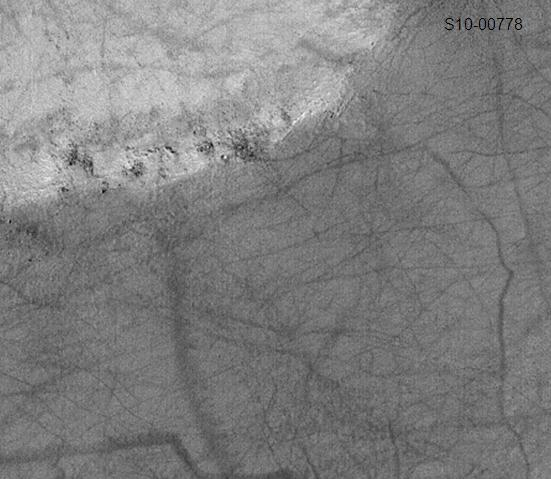
Pattern of large and small tracks made by giant dust devils as seen by Mars Global Surveyor

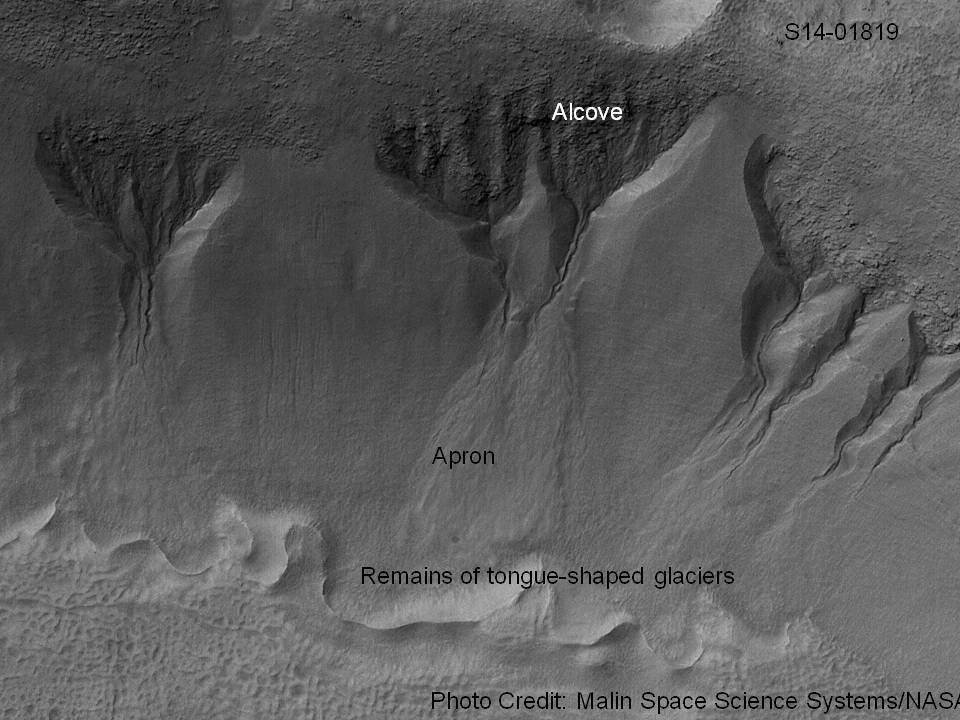
Group of gullies on north wall of crater that lies west of the crater Newton (41.3047 degrees south latitude, 192.89 east longitide). Image taken with Mars Global Surveyor under the MOC Public Targeting Program

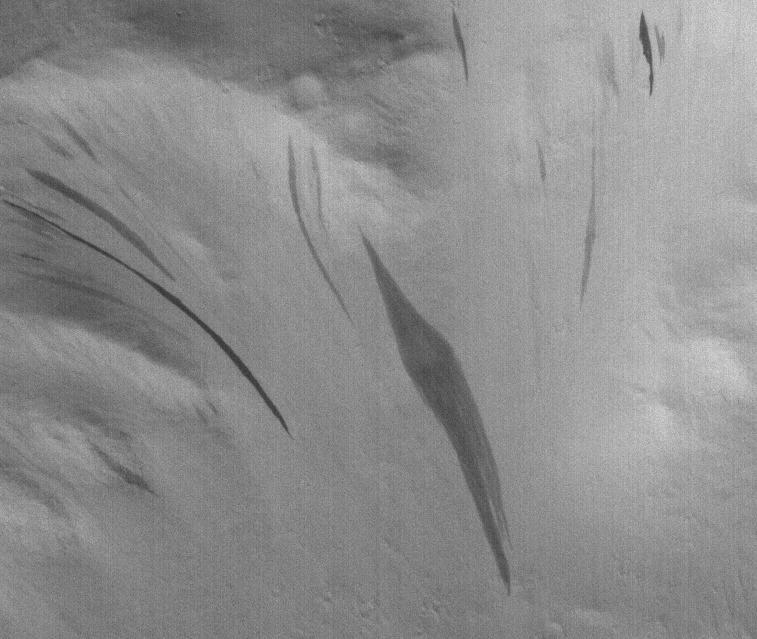
Dark streaks in Diacria quadrangle, as seen by Mars Global Surveyor, under the MOC Public Targeting Program

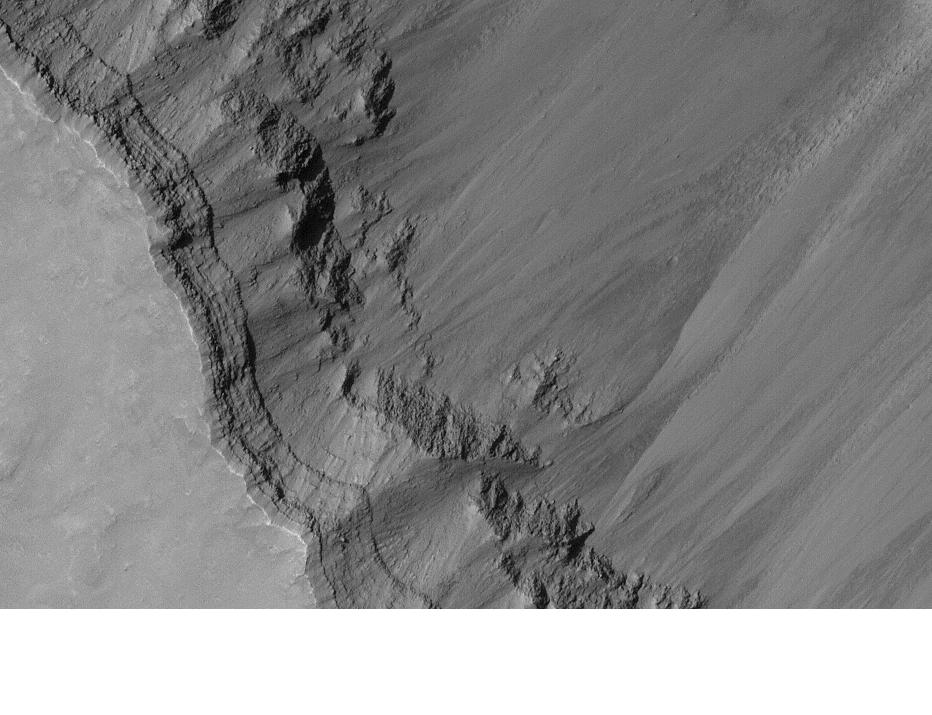
Layers in the canyon wall in Coprates quadrangle, as seen by Mars Global Surveyor, under MOC Public Targeting Program

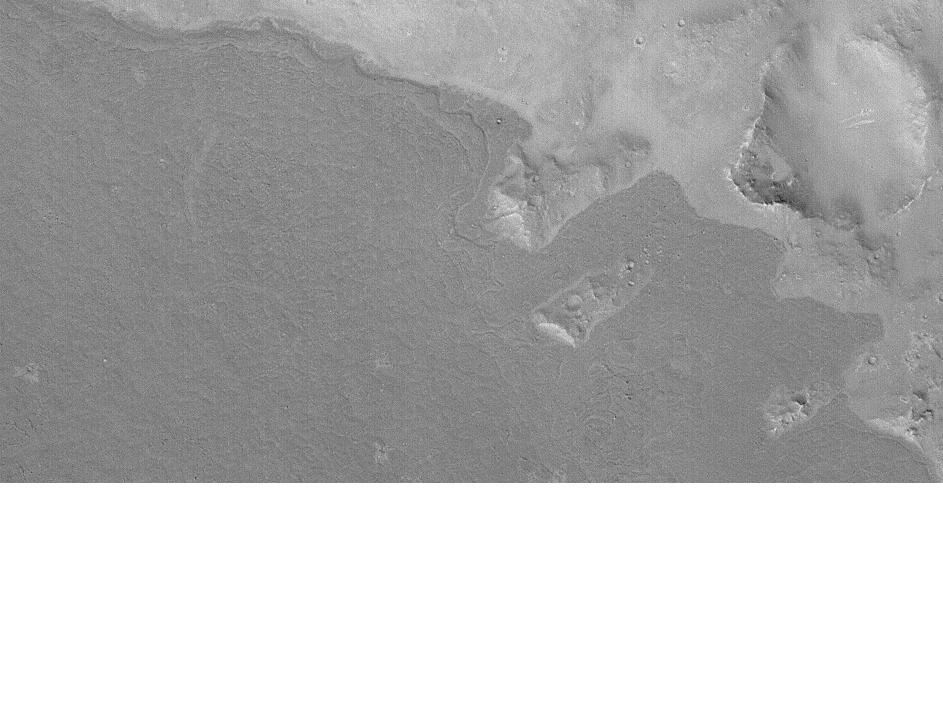
Lava flow in Elysium. There are many lava flows in the Elysium quadrangle. In this one, the lava flowed toward the upper right. Image taken by Mars Global Surveyor, under the MOC Public Targeting Program

== See also ==
- Long Range Reconnaissance Imager (A telescopic imager on the New Horizons spacecraft to Pluto)
- MOC Public Targeting Program

Malin also built and operated other cameras for NASA, including:

- Context (CTX) Camera also for the MRO spacecraft
- JunoCam, on board the Juno spacecraft, deployed in Jupiter orbit in 2016
- Mars Color Imager for the Mars Reconnaissance Orbiter (MRO) spacecraft
