= Lakes on Mars =

Former bodies of water on Mars

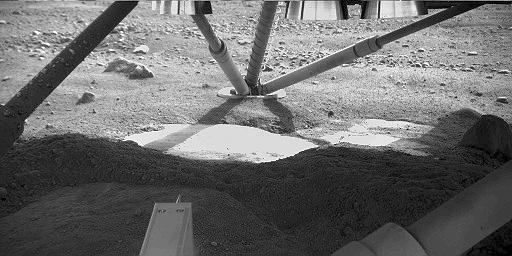
View underneath the Phoenix lander, showing patchy exposures of a bright surface that may be ice.

In summer 1965, the first close-up images from Mars showed a cratered desert with no signs of water. However, over the decades, as more parts of the planet were imaged with better cameras on more sophisticated satellites, Mars showed evidence of past river valleys, lakes and present ice in glaciers and in the ground. It was discovered that the climate of Mars displays huge changes over geologic time because its axis is not stabilized by a large moon, as Earth's is. Also, some researchers maintain that surface liquid water could have existed for periods of time due to geothermal effects, chemical composition, or asteroid impacts. This article describes some of the places that could have held large lakes.

== Overview ==
Besides seeing features that were signs of past surface water, researchers found other types of evidence for past water. Minerals detected in many locations needed water to form. An instrument in 2001 Mars Odyssey orbiter mapped the distribution of water in the shallow surface. When the Phoenix lander fired its retrorockets to land in the far north, ice was exposed.

When water enters a large body of water, such as a lake, a delta may form. Many craters and other depressions on Mars show deltas that resemble those on Earth. In addition, if a lake lies in a depression, channels entering it will all stop at the same altitude. Such an arrangement is visible around places on Mars that are supposed to have contained large bodies of water, including around a possible ocean in the north.

Lake formation in the past has been suspected by various researchers for quite some time. One study found 205 possible closed-basin lakes in craters on Mars. The basins have an inlet valley that cuts the crater rim and flows into the basin, but they have no visible outlet valley. The total volume of the basins is equivalent to a depth of 1.2 meters spread evenly over the Martian surface. However, this amount is a small fraction of the current water ice stores on Mars. Another study found 210 open-basin lakes. These were lakes with both an inlet and an outlet; hence water must have entered the basin, and reached the height of the outlet. Some of these lakes had volumes similar to Earth's Caspian Sea, Black Sea, and Lake Baikal. A study presented at the 2018 Lunar and Planetary Science Conference found 64 paleolakes in the northwest Hellas region. The team suggested that these lakes formed from an ocean that occupied the Hellas basin and southeast lowland. CRISM data for the region showed aqueous minerals such as Fe/Mg smectites, anhydrous chloride, and probably carbonates. Such an ocean was suggested by a team of researchers in 2016. Forty-eight possible extinct lakes were found in Arabia Terra. Some were classified as open-basin systems because they showed evidence for an outlet channel. These lakes ranged from tens of meters to tens of kilometers in size. Many of these lakes were discovered by looking for inverted reliefs.

Some lakes in craters in Terra Sabaea are believed to have formed from the melting of glaciers on their rims. Inverted streams are found on the floors of some craters. Water from glaciers carried debris in channels and consequently that debris was left behind after the surrounding ground eroded.

In a study released in 2018, researchers found 34 paleolakes and associated channels in the northeastern Hellas Basin. Some were close to the Hadriacus volcano. Dikes from the volcano could have created hydrothermal systems, thereby allowing ice to melt. Some appeared to have formed from precipitation, others from groundwater.

Moreover, some basins on Mars form part of long chains of lakes. The Naktong/Scamander/Mamers Valles lake-chain system is about 4,500 km (2,800 mi) long, with a drainage area similar to that of the Missouri-Mississippi rivers. Another, the Samara/Himera Vallis system, is 1800 km long. Many of the long chains of lakes are found in the Margaritifer Sinus quadrangle.

Some of the lakes appear to have had a high volume as compared to their drainage area; hence, it is thought that some of the water was groundwater. Further evidence is the existence of knobby material on the basin floors. These knobs could have been formed when large amounts of water left the ground.

In February 2019, a group of European scientists published geological evidence of an ancient planet-wide groundwater system that was probably connected to a Martian ocean. The study was of 24 craters that did not display an inlet or outlet; hence, water for the lake would have come from the ground. All craters were located in the northern hemisphere of Mars. These craters had floors lying roughly 4000 m below Martian 'sea level' (a level that, given the planet's lack of seas, is defined based on elevation and atmospheric pressure). Features on the floors of these craters could only have formed in the presence of water. Many craters contain multiple features showing that the water level in the craters rose and fell over time. Deltas and terraces were present in some craters. Minerals such as various clays and light-toned minerals that form in water are found on some of the crater floors. Also, layers are found in some of these craters. Taken together, these observations strongly suggest that water was present in these places. Some of the craters studied were Pettit, Sagan, Nicholson, Mclaughlin, du Martheray, Tombaugh, Mojave, Curie, Oyama, and Wahoo. It seems that if a crater was deep enough, water came out of the ground and produced a lake.

== Images of possible deltas ==
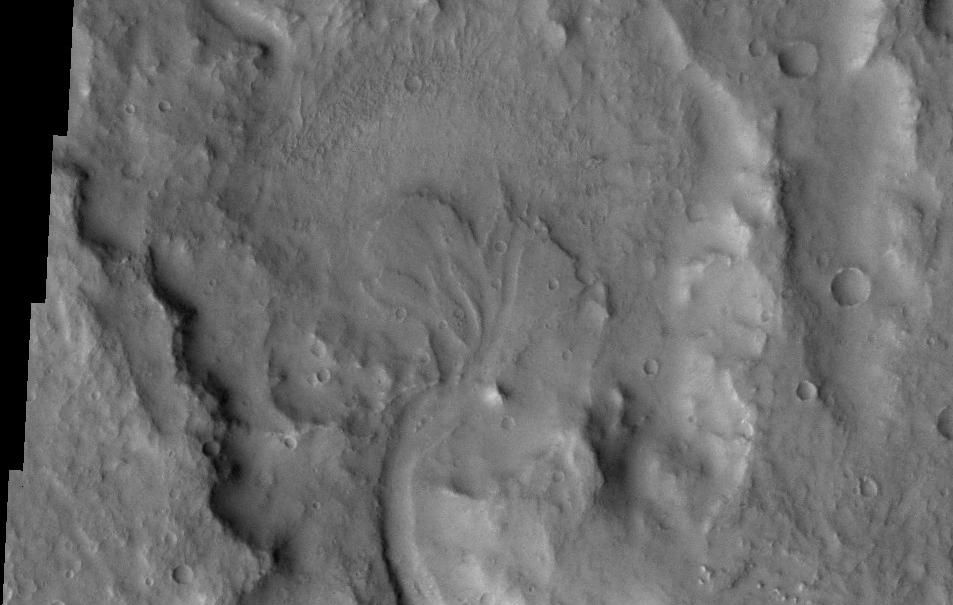
Possible delta in Margaritifer Sinus quadrangle as seen by THEMIS.

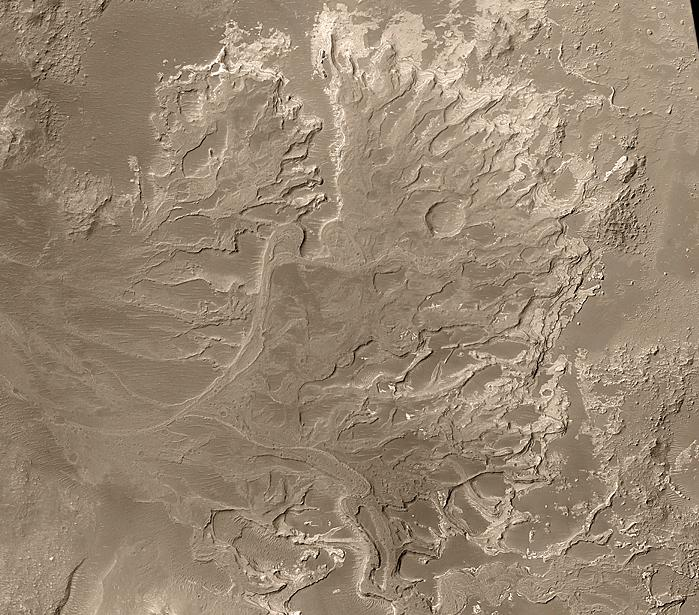
Probable delta in Eberswalde Crater that lies to the NE of Holden Crater, as seen by Mars Global Surveyor. Image in Margaritifer Sinus quadrangle.

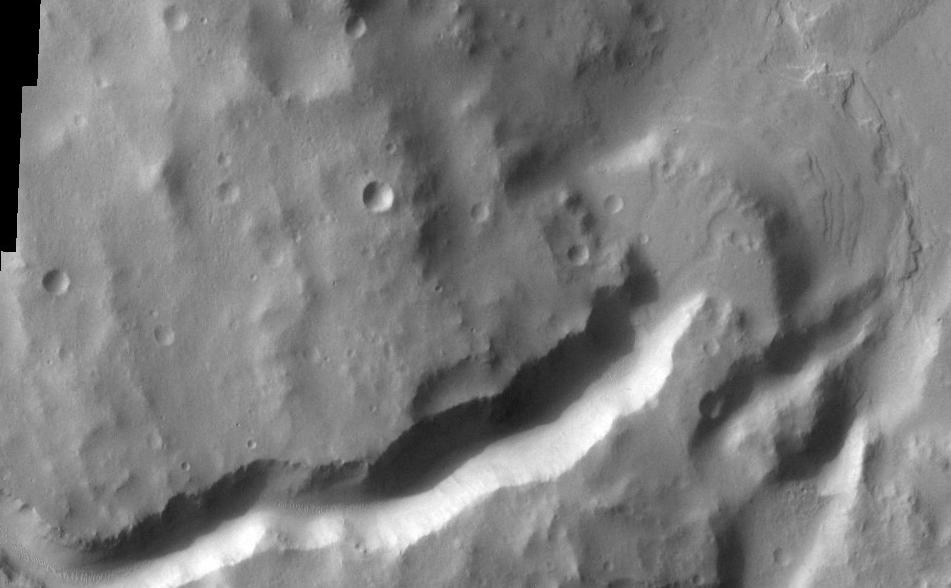
Delta in Lunae Palus quadrangle, as seen by THEMIS.

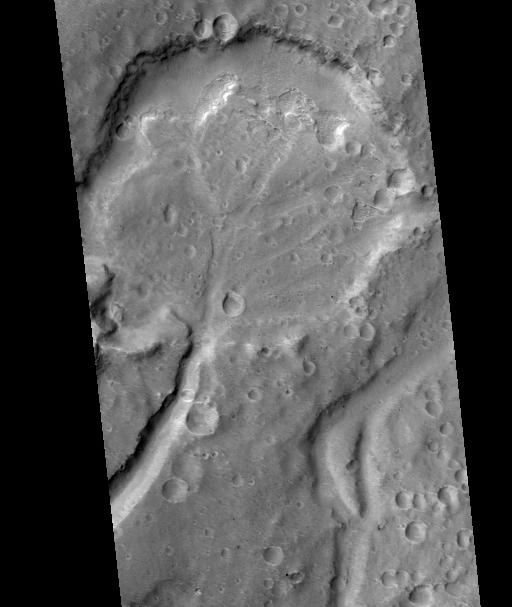
Delta that fills a crater in Lunae Palus quadrangle, as seen by HiRISE.

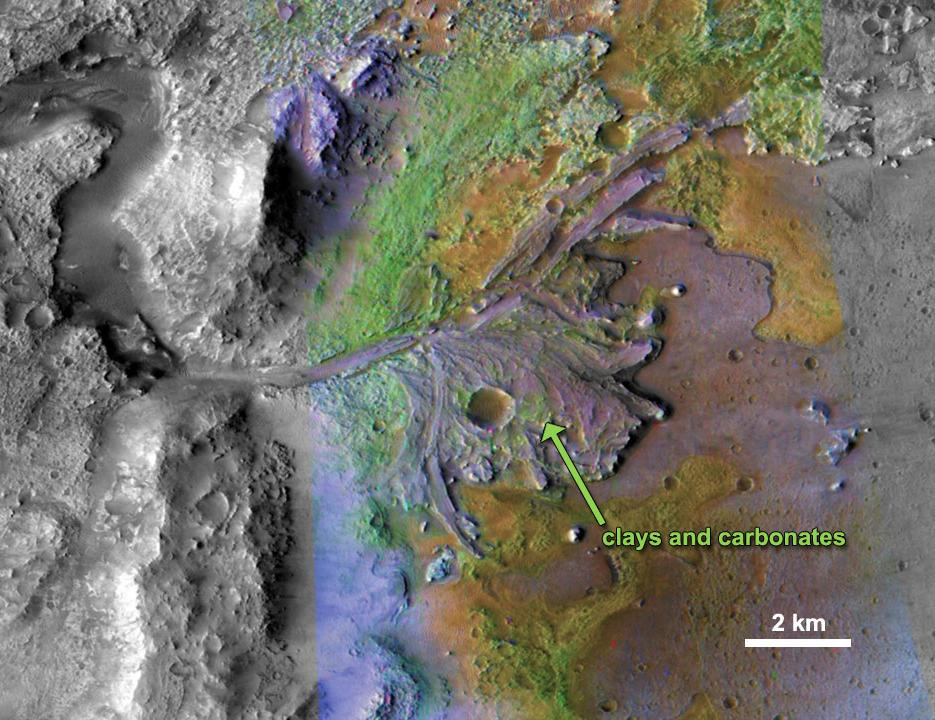
Jezero crater delta - chemical alteration by water (hi-res)

== Mars ocean ==
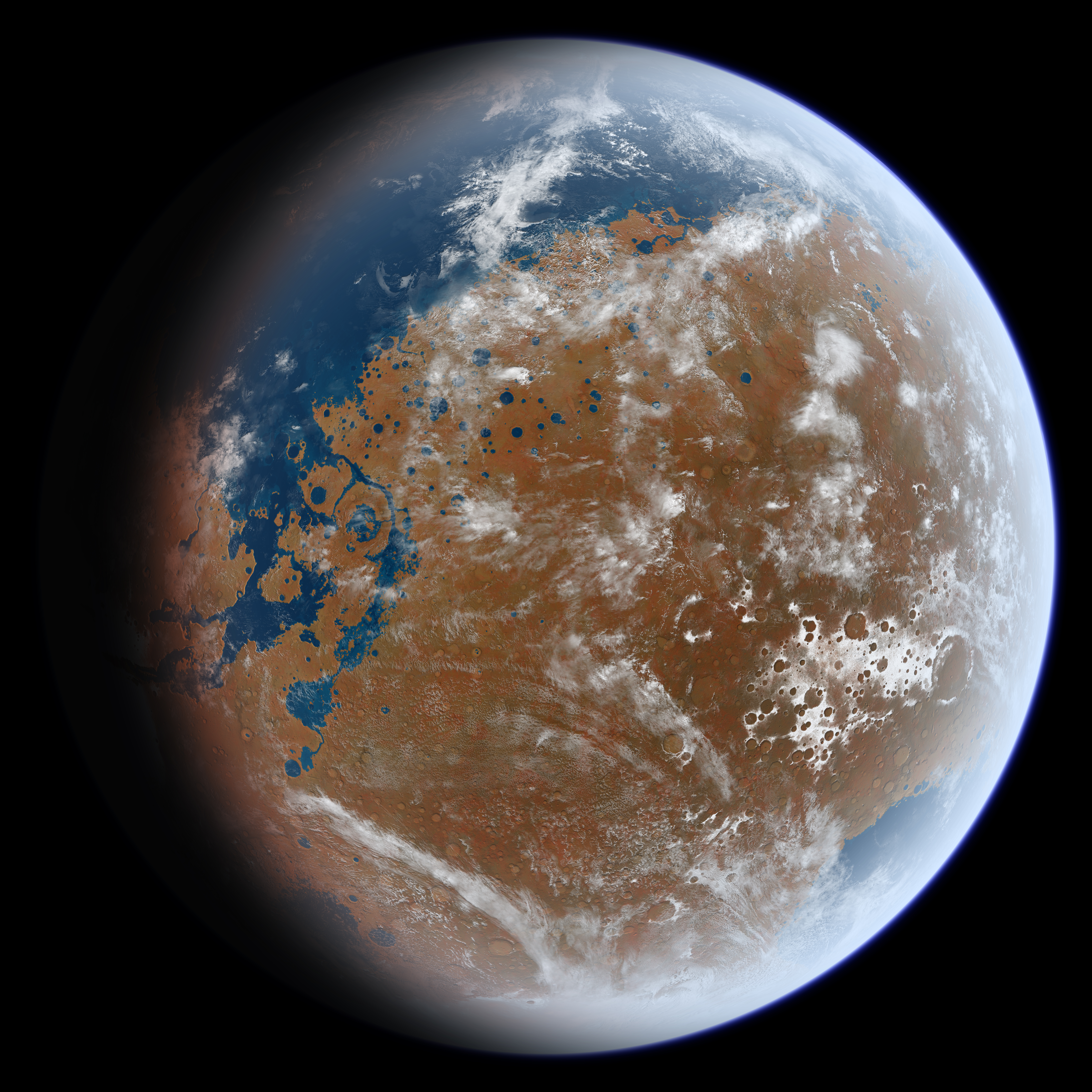
An artist's impression of ancient Mars and its oceans based on geological data

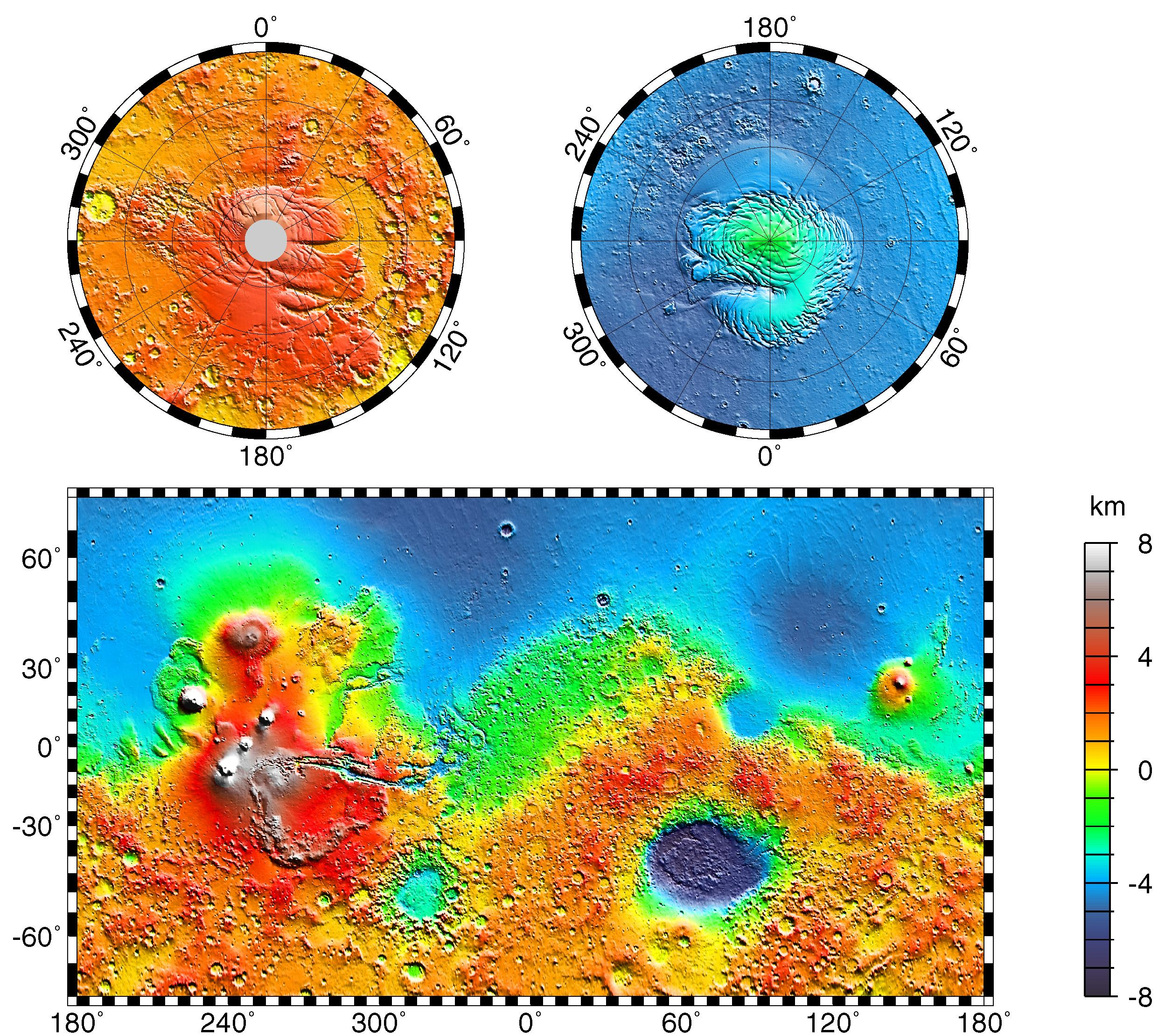
The blue region of low topography in the Martian northern hemisphere is hypothesized to be the site of a primordial ocean of liquid water.

The Mars ocean hypothesis postulates that nearly a third of the surface of Mars was covered by an ocean of liquid water early in the planet's geologic history. This primordial ocean, dubbed paleo-ocean and Oceanus Borealis, would have filled the Vastitas Borealis basin in the northern hemisphere, a region which lies 4–5 km (2.5–3.1 mi) below the mean planetary elevation, about 3.8 billion years ago. Evidence for this ocean includes geographic features resembling ancient shorelines, and the chemical properties of the Martian soil and atmosphere. However, for such an ocean to have existed, early Mars would have required a magnetosphere, a denser atmosphere, and warmer climate to allow liquid water to remain at the surface.

=== Observational evidence ===
Features first shown by the Viking orbiters in 1976 revealed two possible ancient shorelines near the pole, Arabia and Deuteronilus, each thousands of kilometers long. Several physical features in the present geography of Mars suggest the past existence of a primordial ocean. Networks of gullies that merge into larger channels imply erosion by a liquid flow and resemble ancient riverbeds on Earth. Enormous channels, 25 km wide and several hundred meters deep, appear to have flowed directly from underground aquifers in the Southern uplands into the Northern plains. Much of the northern hemisphere of Mars is at a significantly lower elevation than the rest of the planet (the Martian dichotomy), and is unusually flat. The low elevation would cause water, if it existed, to gather there. An ocean would tend to level out the ground underneath it.

The acceptance of a vast northern ocean has waxed and waned over the decades. Beginning in 1998, scientists Michael Malin and Kenneth Edgett set out to investigate, using cameras on board the Mars Global Surveyor with a resolution five to ten times better than those of the Viking orbiter, in places that would test shorelines proposed by others in the scientific literature. Their analysis was inconclusive at best, and reported that the shoreline varies in elevation by several kilometers, rising and falling from one peak to the next for thousands of miles. This report cast doubt on whether the features truly mark a long-gone sea coast, and has been taken as an argument against the Martian shoreline (and ocean) hypothesis.

Research published in 2009 shows a much higher density of stream channels than formerly estimated. Regions on Mars with the most valleys are comparable to what is found on Earth. The research team developed a computer program to identify valleys by searching in topographical data for U-shaped structures. The large extent of valley networks found strongly supports rain on the planet in the past. The global pattern of the Martian valleys could be explained by an extensive northern ocean. A large ocean in the northern hemisphere would explain why there is a southern limit to valley networks: the southernmost regions of Mars, farthest from the water reservoir, would get little rainfall and would develop no valleys. Similarly, the lack of rainfall would explain why Martian valleys become shallower from north to south.

A 2010 study of river deltas on Mars revealed that seventeen of them are found at the altitude of a proposed shoreline for a Martian ocean. This is what would be expected if the deltas were all next to a large body of water.

Research published in 2012 using data from MARSIS, a radar on board the Mars Express orbiter, supports the hypothesis of a former large northern ocean. The instrument revealed a dielectric constant of the surface similar to those of low-density sedimentary deposits, massive deposits of ground-ice, or a combination of the two. The measurements were not like those of a lava-rich surface.

In March 2015, scientists stated that evidence exists for an ancient volume of water that could comprise an ocean, likely in the planet's northern hemisphere and about the size of Earth's Arctic Ocean. This finding was derived from the ratio of water and deuterium in the modern Martian atmosphere compared to the ratio found on Earth and derived from telescopic observations. Eight times as much deuterium was inferred at the polar deposits of Mars than exists on Earth (VSMOW), suggesting that ancient Mars had significantly higher levels of water. The representative atmospheric value obtained from the maps (7 VSMOW) is not affected by climatological effects as those measured by localized rovers, although the telescopic measurements are within range to the enrichment measured by the Curiosity rover in Gale Crater of 5–7 VSMOW.

== Valles Marineris canyon system ==
Coprates quadrangle
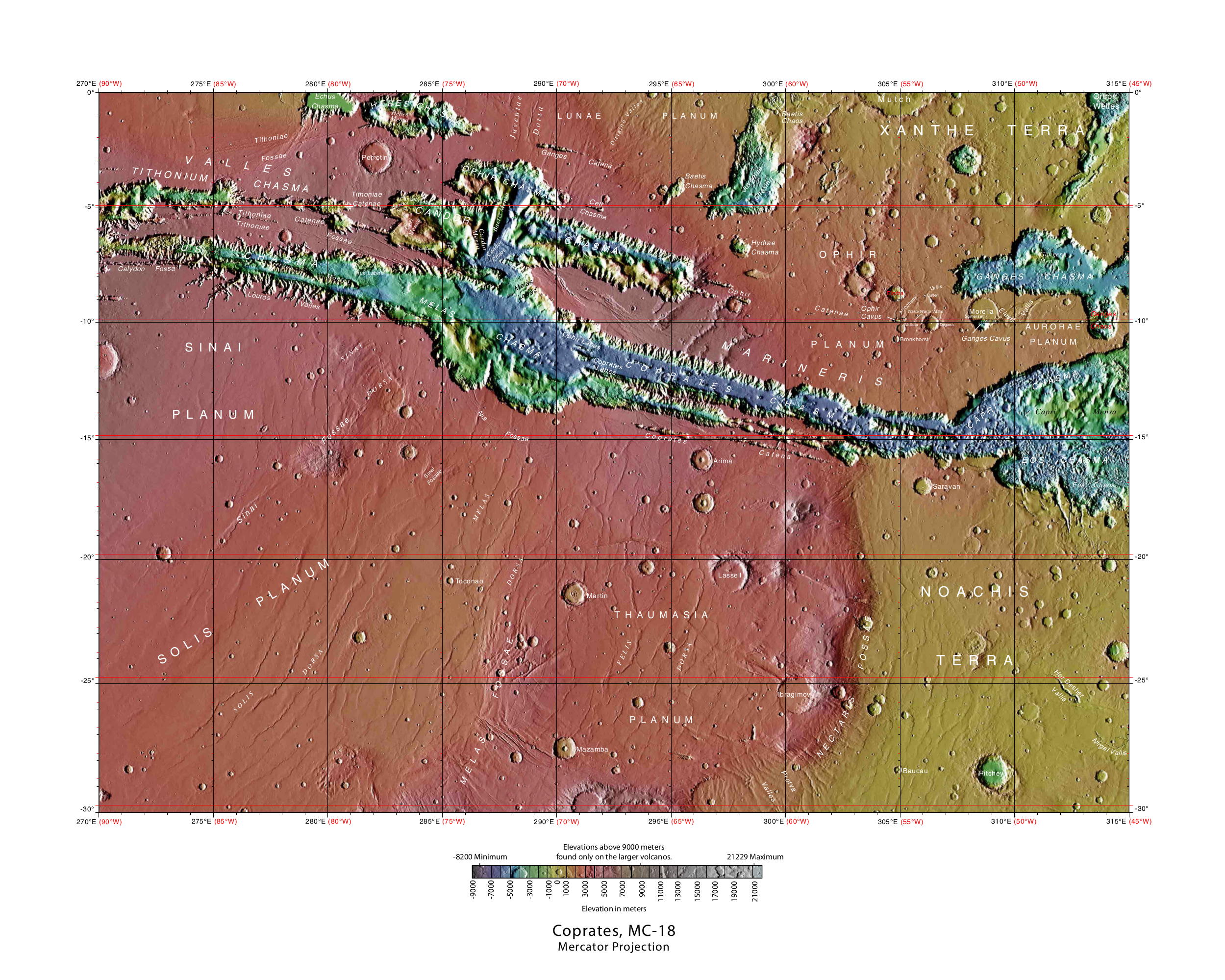
- Map of Coprates quadrangle from Mars Orbiter Laser Altimeter (MOLA) data. The highest elevations are red and the lowest are blue.
- Coordinates: 15°S 67.5°W

Valles Marineris is the largest canyon system in the Solar System, and much evidence suggests that all or parts of the canyon system contained lakes. It is located in the Coprates quadrangle. The walls of the canyons often contain many layers. The floors of some of the canyons contain large deposits of layered materials. Some researchers think that the layers were formed when water once filled the canyons.

Layered deposits, called interior layered deposits (ILDs), in various parts of Valles Marineris, especially Candor Chasma and Juventae Chasma, have led many researchers to suspect that they were formed when the whole area was a giant lake. However, many other ideas have been advanced to attempt to explain them. High-resolution structural and geologic mapping in west Candor Chasma, presented in March 2015, showed that the deposits on the floor of the Candor Chasma are basin-filling sediments that were deposited in a wet playa-like setting; hence water was involved in their formation.

Minerals that generally require water for their formation have been found in ILDs, thus supporting water in the system. The European Space Agency's Mars Express found possible evidence for the sulfates epsomite and kieserite, minerals that form in water. Ferric oxide in the form of crystalline grey hematite, which typically requires water for its formation, was also detected.

Although there is much controversy about a lake in the whole of Valles Marineris, a fairly strong case can be made for smaller lakes.

Melas Chasma is thought to have once contained a lake, as it is the deepest part of the Valles Marineris system at 11 km (6.8 mi) below the surrounding surface. From here to the outflow channels there is about a 0.03-degree slope upward to the northern plains, which means that if the canyon was filled with liquid, there would be a lake 1 km deep before the fluid would flow out onto the northern plains. Melas Chasma is the widest segment of the Valles Marineris canyon system, located east of Ius Chasma at 9.8°S, 283.6°E in Coprates quadrangle. It cuts through layered deposits that are thought to be sediments from an old lake that resulted from runoff of the valley networks to the west. Support for abundant past water in Melas Chasma comes from the discovery by MRO of hydrated sulfates that need water for their formation. Moreover, in a 2015 study of southwestern Melas Chasma, using high-resolution image, topographic and spectral datasets, eleven fan-shaped landforms were found. These fans add to growing evidence that Melas Chasma once held a lake which fluctuated in level. A lake could have formed in the southwest part of Melas Chasma from runoff from local valley networks.

Scientists described strong evidence for a lake in the eastern part of Valles Marineris, especially in Coprates Chasma. It would have had an average depth of only 842 m—much shallower than the 5–10 km depth of parts of Valles Marineris. Still, its volume of 110,000 km^{3} would be comparable to Earth's Caspian Sea. The main evidence for such a lake is the presence of benches at the level that models show is where the lake level should be. Also, the low point in Eos Chasma where water would be expected to overflow is marked by fluvial features. The features look as if the flow came together in a small area and caused significant erosion.

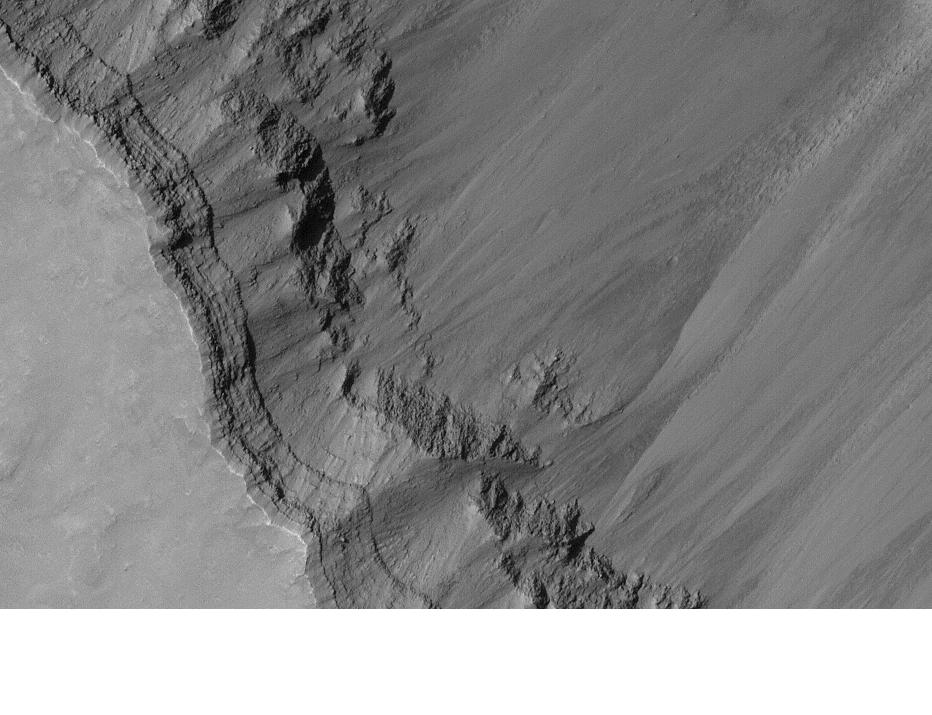
Layers in the canyon wall in Coprates, as seen by Mars Global Surveyor, under the MOC Public Targeting Program.

== Hellas Basin ==
The Hellas quadrangle contains part of the Hellas Basin, the largest known impact crater on the surface of Mars and the second largest in the Solar System. The depth of the crater is 7152 m (23,000 ft) below the standard topographic datum of Mars. The basin is located in the southern highlands of Mars and is thought to have been formed about 3.9 billion years ago, during the Late Heavy Bombardment.

It is thought that a large lake existed in the Hellas Basin early in the planet's history with a possible depth of 5.5 km. Possible shorelines have been discovered. These shorelines are evident in alternating benches and scarps visible in Mars orbiting camera narrow-angle images. A good example of layers that were deposited in Hellas, and later exposed by erosion, is visible in Terby Crater on the north rim of Hellas. It used to be thought that Terby Crater contained a large delta. However, later observations have led researchers to think of the layered sequence as part of a group of layers that may have extended all the across Hellas. There is no valley at the northern rim of Terby large enough to have carried the large amount of sediments necessary to produce the layers. Other observations argue against Terby containing a delta. In addition, Mars orbiting laser altimeter (MOLA) data show that the contacts of these sedimentary units mark contours of constant elevation for thousands of km, and in one case all around the basin.

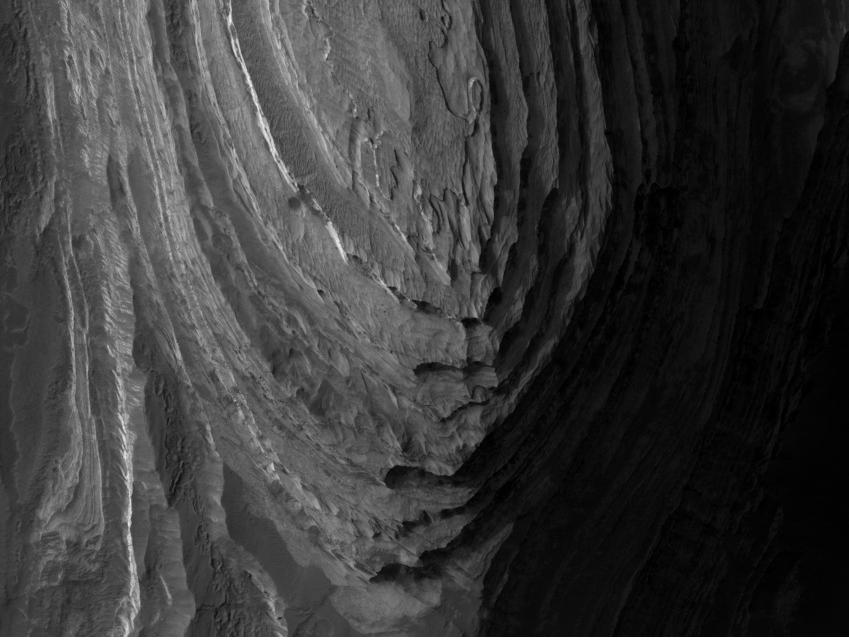
Layers in Terby crater may have formed when the Hellas basin was filled with water.

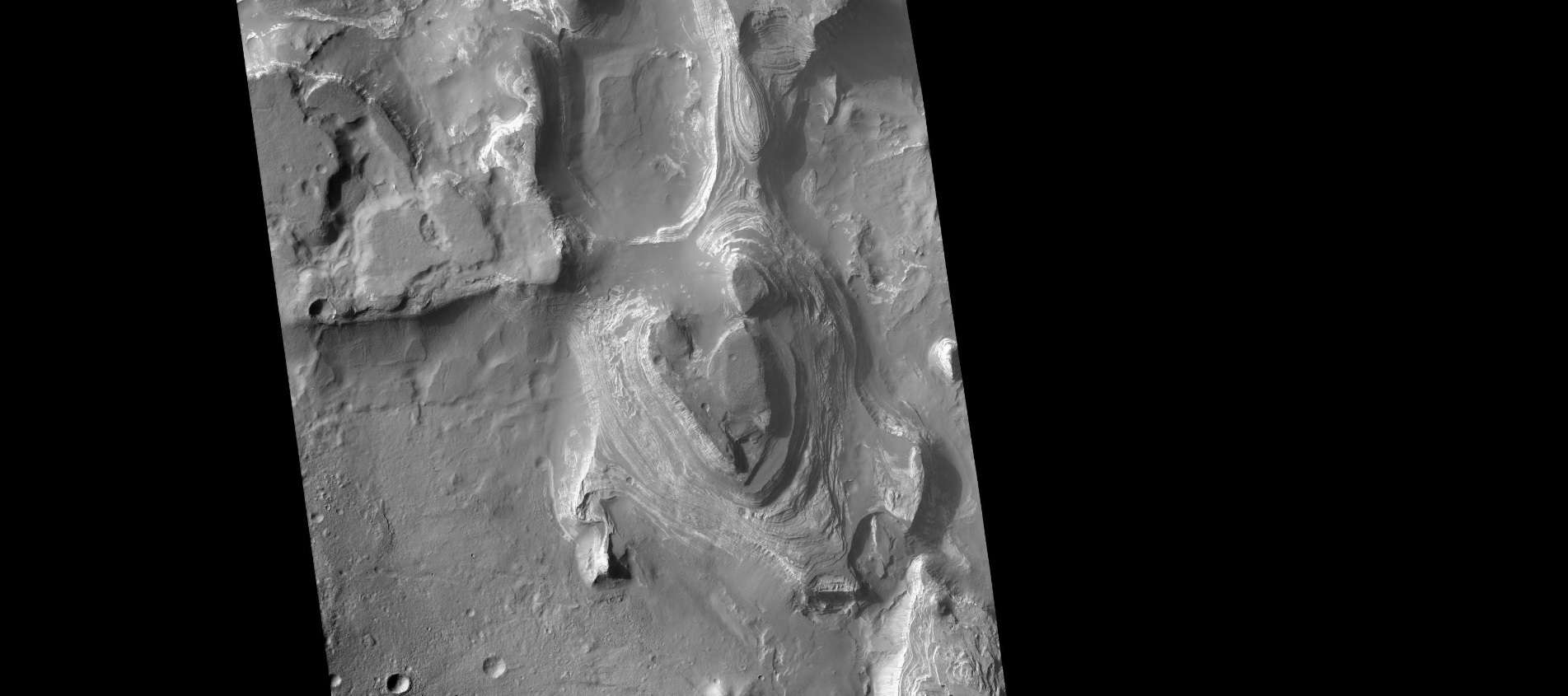
Northern part of Terby Crater showing many layers, as seen by CTX camera (on Mars Reconnaissance Orbiter). Parts of this image are enlarged in next two images.

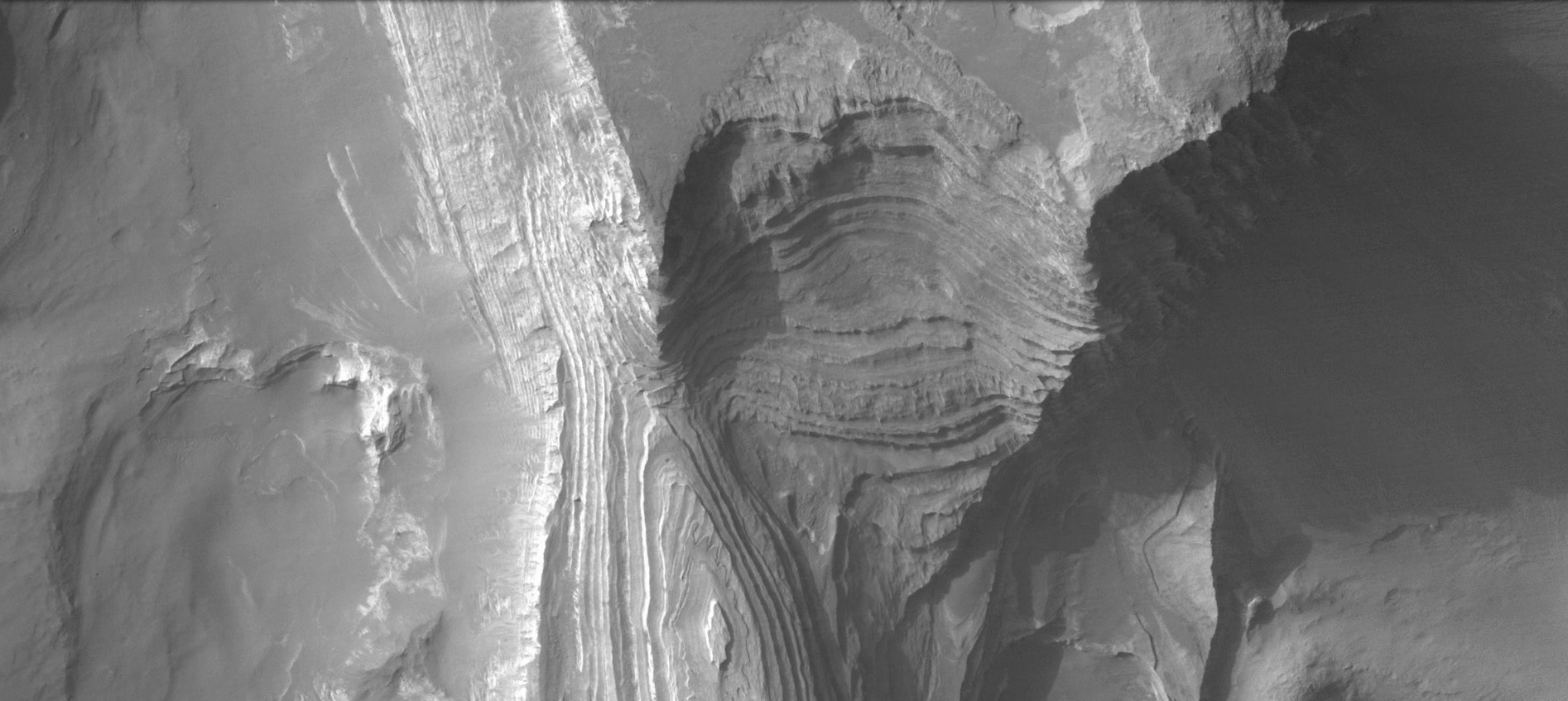
Northern part of Terby Crater showing many layers, as seen by CTX camera (on Mars Reconnaissance Orbiter).

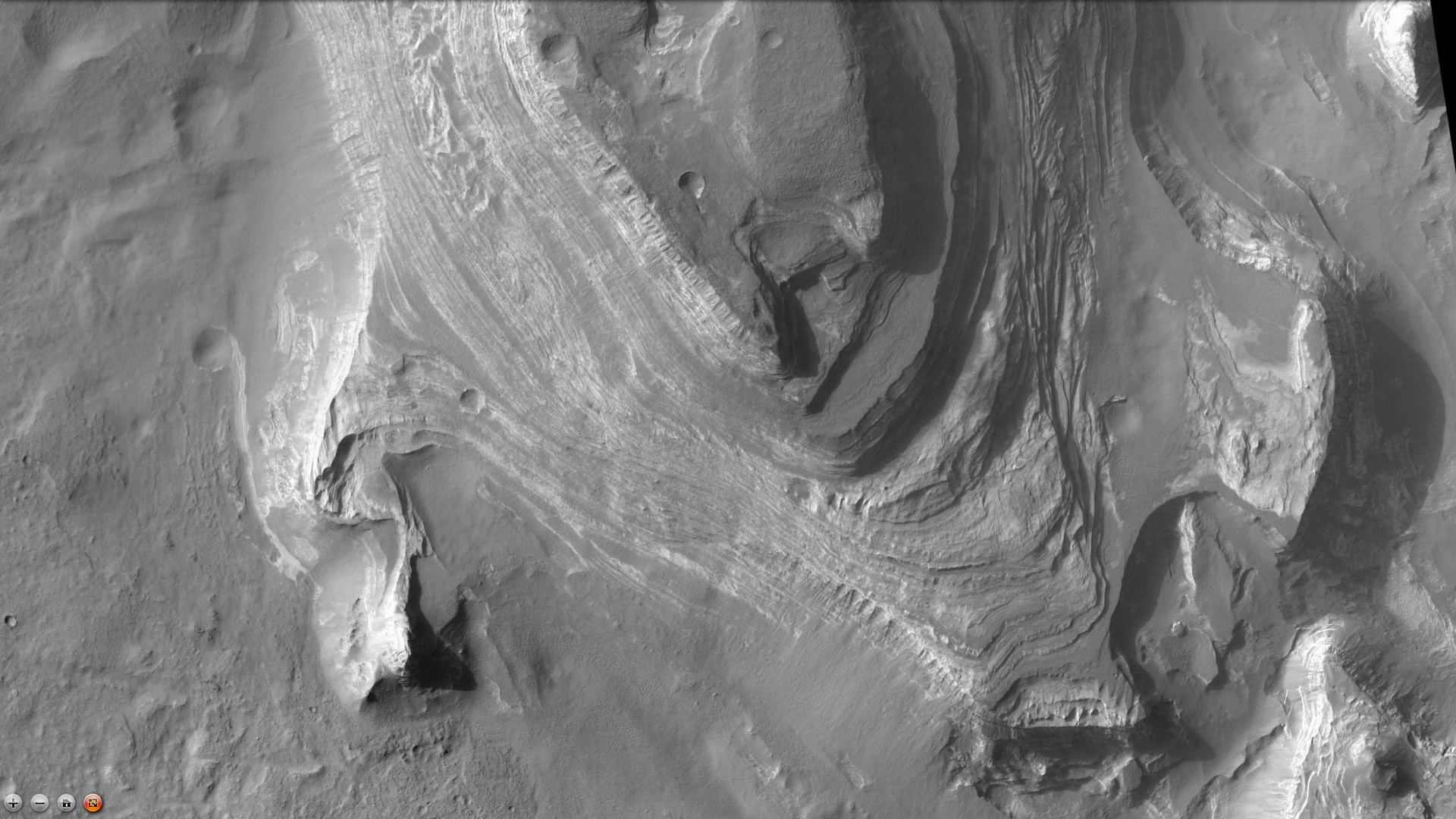
Northern part of Terby Crater showing many layers, as seen by CTX camera (on Mars Reconnaissance Orbiter).

Channels, thought to be formed by water, enter the basin on all sides.

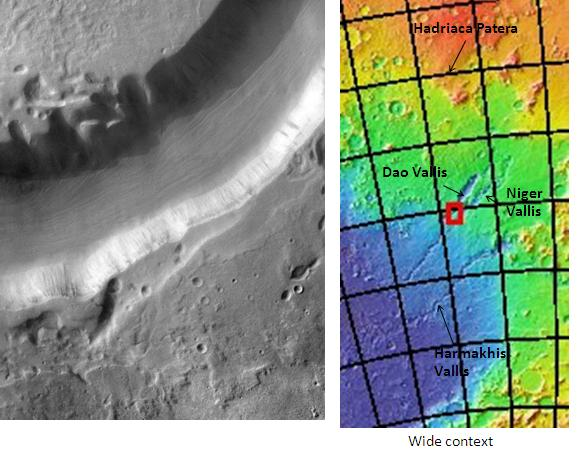
Dao Vallis, as seen by THEMIS. Click on image to see relationship of Dao Vallis to other nearby features, especially channels.

Dao Vallis begins near a large volcano, called Hadriaca Patera, so it is thought to have received water when hot magma melted huge amounts of ice in the frozen ground. The partially circular depressions on the left side of the channel in the adjacent image suggest that groundwater sapping also contributed water.

The Hellas drainage basin may be almost one-fifth the area of the entire northern plains. A lake in Hellas in today's Martian climate would form thick ice at the top that would eventually be removed by sublimation: the ice would turn directly from solid state to gas, as dry ice (solid CO_{2}) does on Earth. Glacial features (terminal moraines, drumlins, and eskers) have been found that may have been formed when the water froze.

A lake filling the Hellas Basin may have lasted a very long time, particularly if there were some geothermal sources of heat. Consequently, microbial life may have had time to develop there.

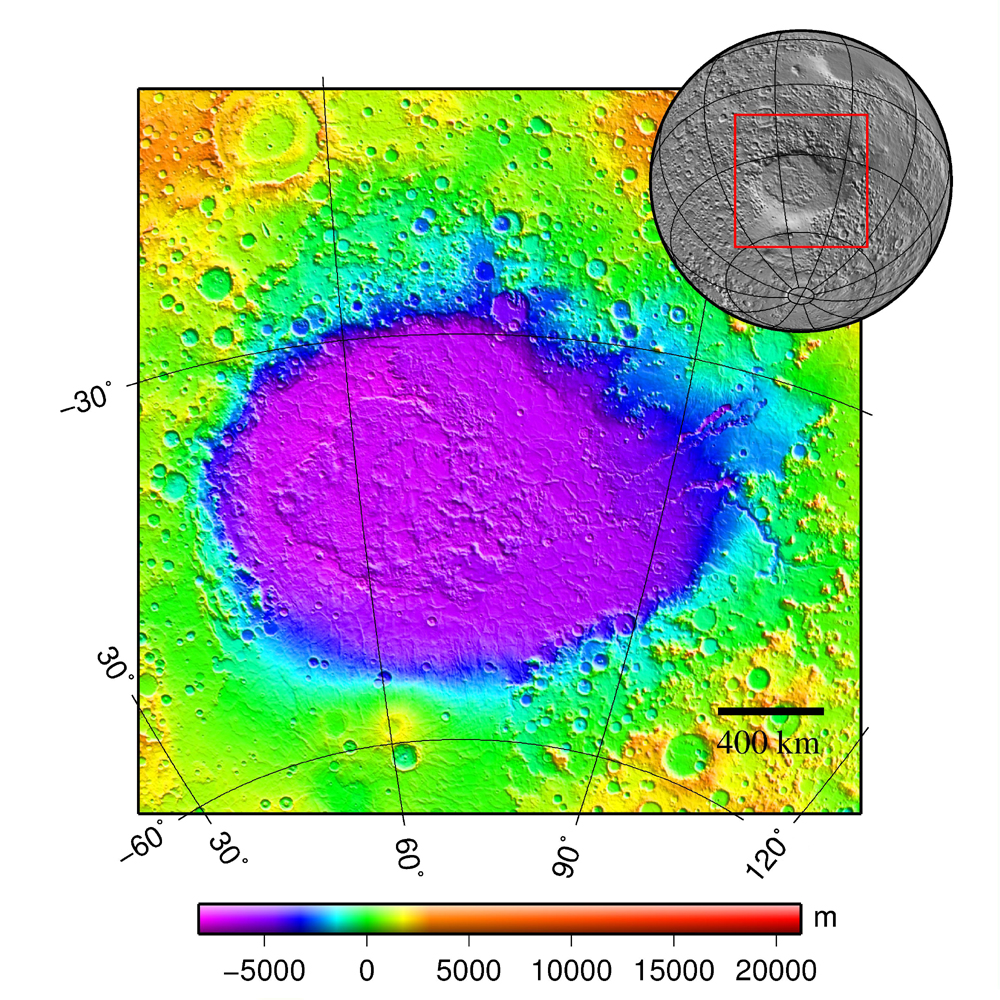
Hellas Basin Area topography. Crater depth is 7152 m (23,000 ft) below the standard topographic datum of Mars.

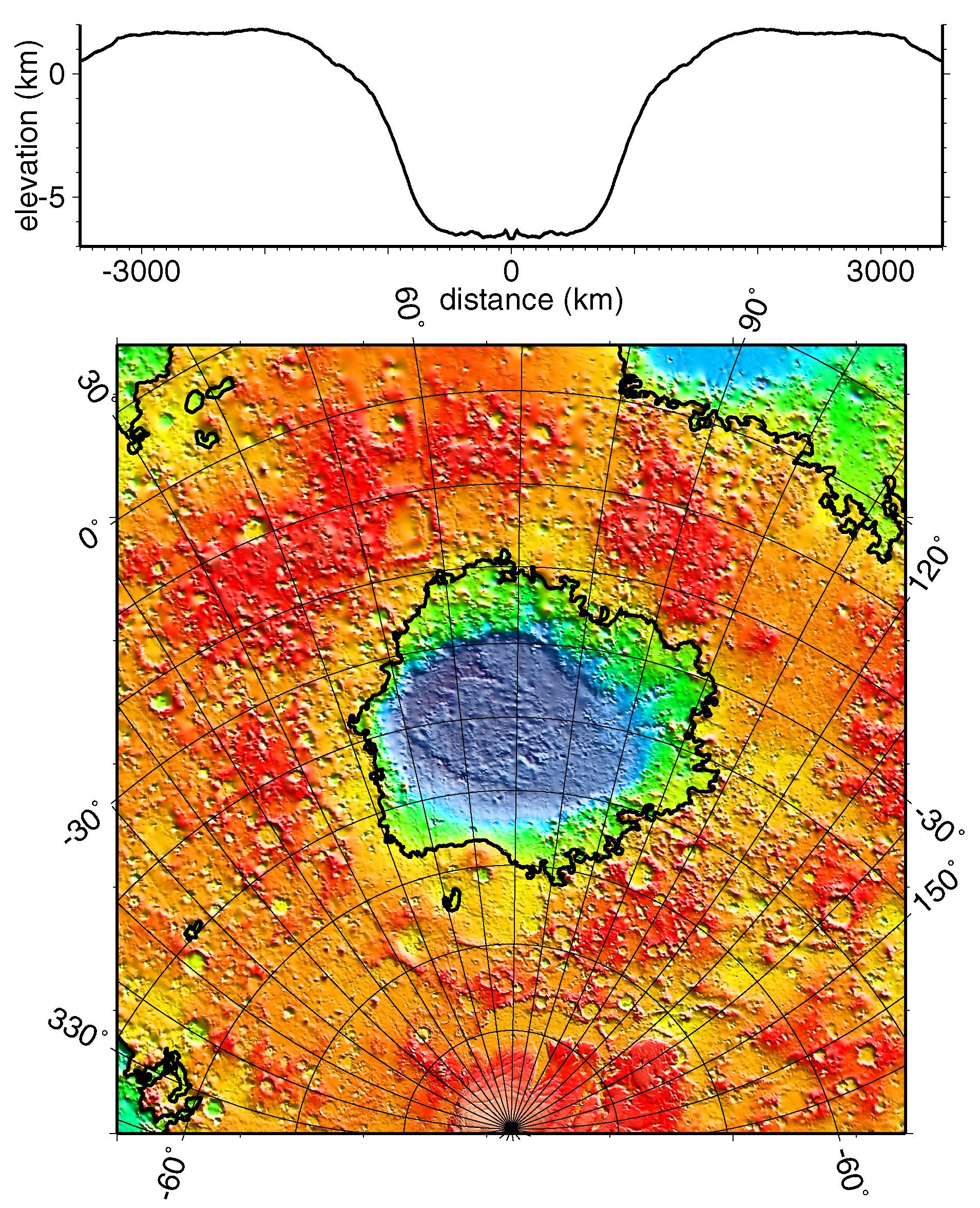
Hellas Basin with graph showing the great depth of the crater. It is the deepest crater on Mars and has the highest surface pressure: 1155 Pa (11.55 mbar, 0.17 psi, or 0.01 atm).

== Gale Crater ==
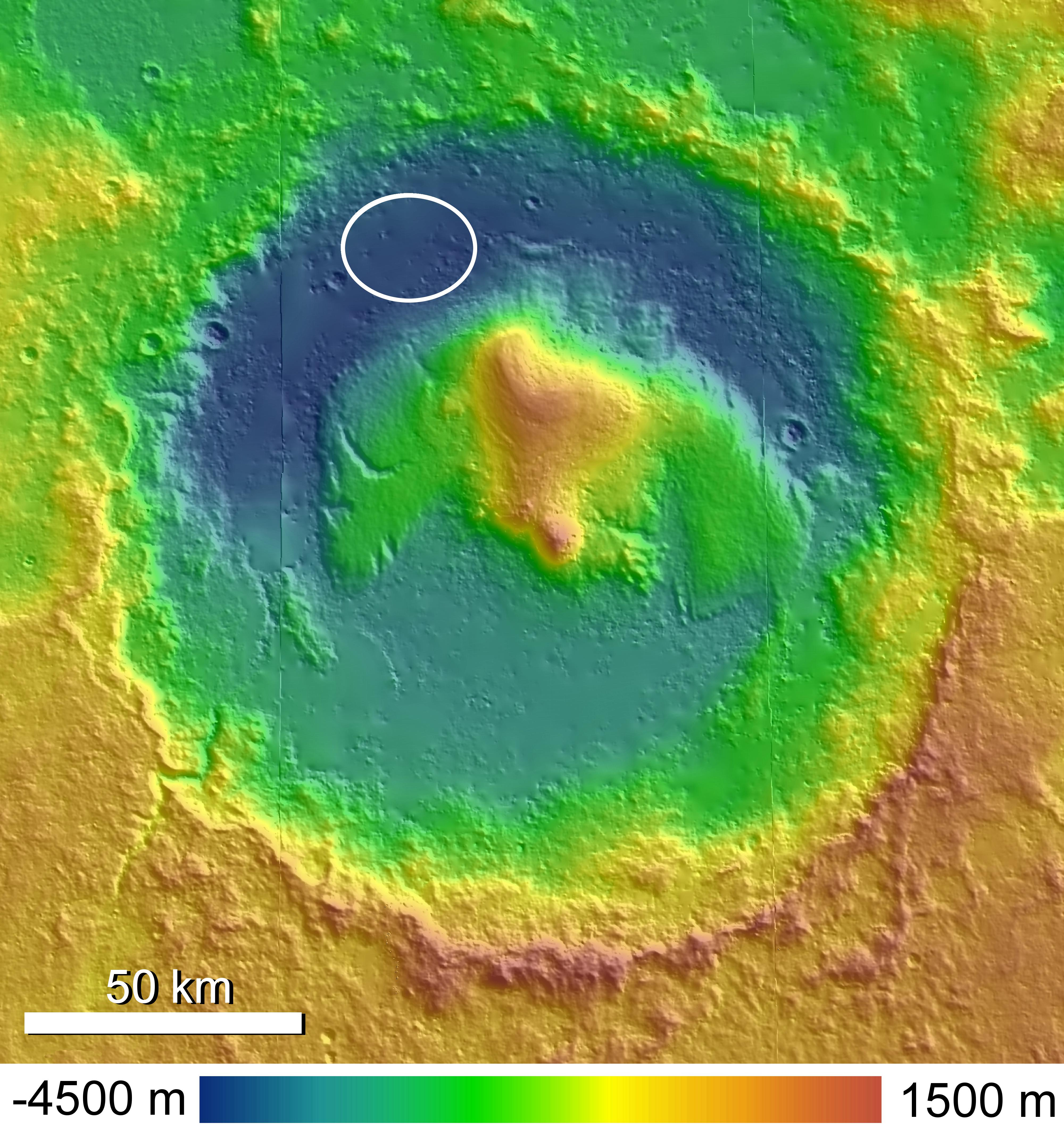
Colorized shaded relief map of Gale crater. The general landing area for Curiosity on the northwestern crater floor, named Aeolis Palus, is circled. (HRSC data)

Gale is a crater on Mars near the northwestern part of the Aeolis quadrangle. Gale is 154 km (96 mi) in diameter and holds a central peak, Aeolis Mons (previously informally named "Mount Sharp" to pay tribute to geologist Robert P. Sharp) rising higher from the crater floor than Mount Rainier rises above Seattle. Strong evidence suggests that Gale Crater once held a large lake. On 6 August 2012, the Mars Science Laboratory landed on Aeolis Palus near Aeolis Mons in Gale Crater.

On 5 August 2012, the Mars Science Laboratory rover, Curiosity, landed at the foot of a layered mountain inside Gale crater. As the mission progressed, discoveries and conclusions were released from NASA detailing the mounting evidence that Gale once contained a large lake. On 27 September 2012, scientists announced that the Curiosity found evidence for an ancient streambed suggesting a "vigorous flow" of water on Mars. On 9 December 2013, NASA reported that Gale Crater contained an ancient freshwater lake which could have been a hospitable environment for microbial life.

Curiosity found fine-grained sedimentary rocks, which represent an ancient lake that would have been suited to support life based on chemolithoautotrophy. This liquid water environment possessed a neutral pH, low salinity, and iron and sulfur in forms usable to certain types of microorganisms. Carbon, hydrogen, oxygen, sulfur, nitrogen—the essential elements for life were measured. Gale's ancient lake might have lasted hundreds to tens of thousands of years.

Clay minerals (trioctahedral) that are formed in the presence of water were found by Curiosity in sedimentary rocks (mudstones) at Yellowknife Bay in Gale Crater. The mudstone samples were named John Klein and Cumberland. They are estimated to have formed later than the Noachian period which means that water may have existed there longer than previously thought.

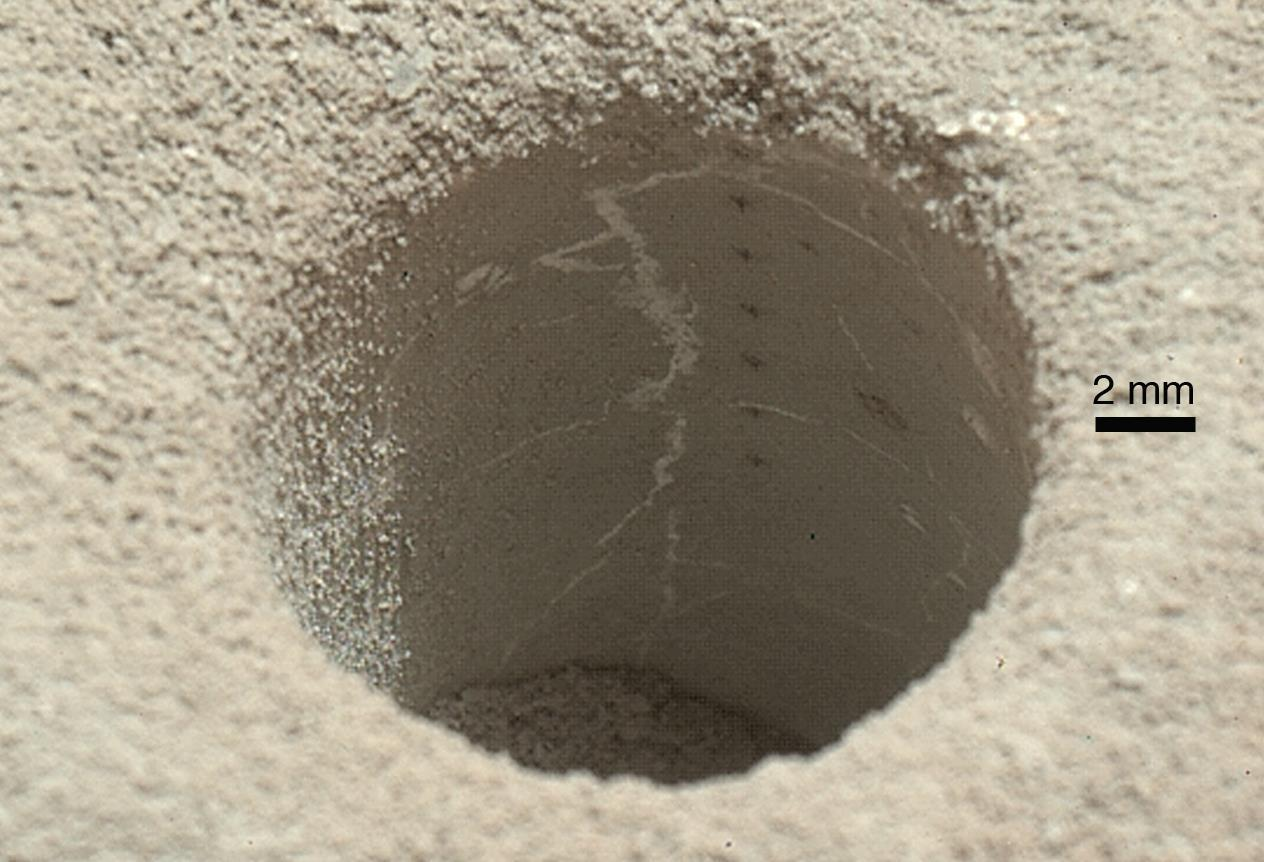
Hole (1.6 cm (0.63 in)) drilled into "John Klein" mudstone.

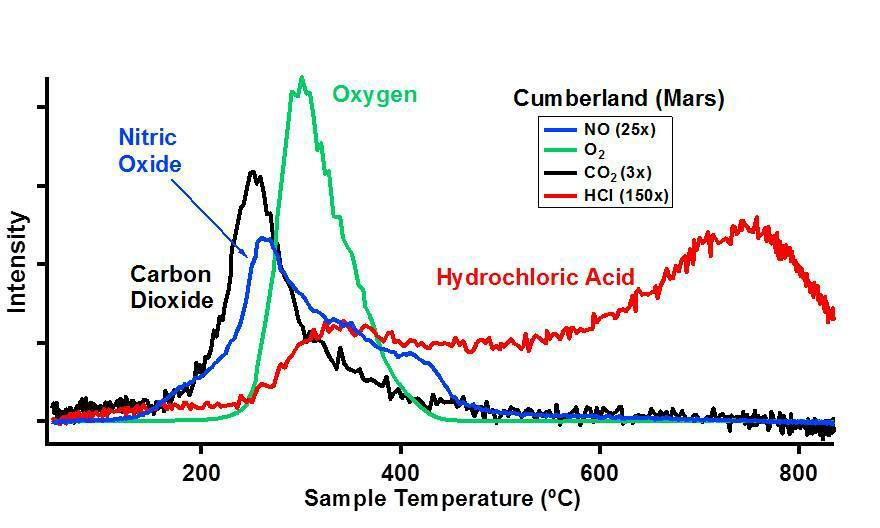
Spectral Analysis (SAM) of "Cumberland" mudstone.

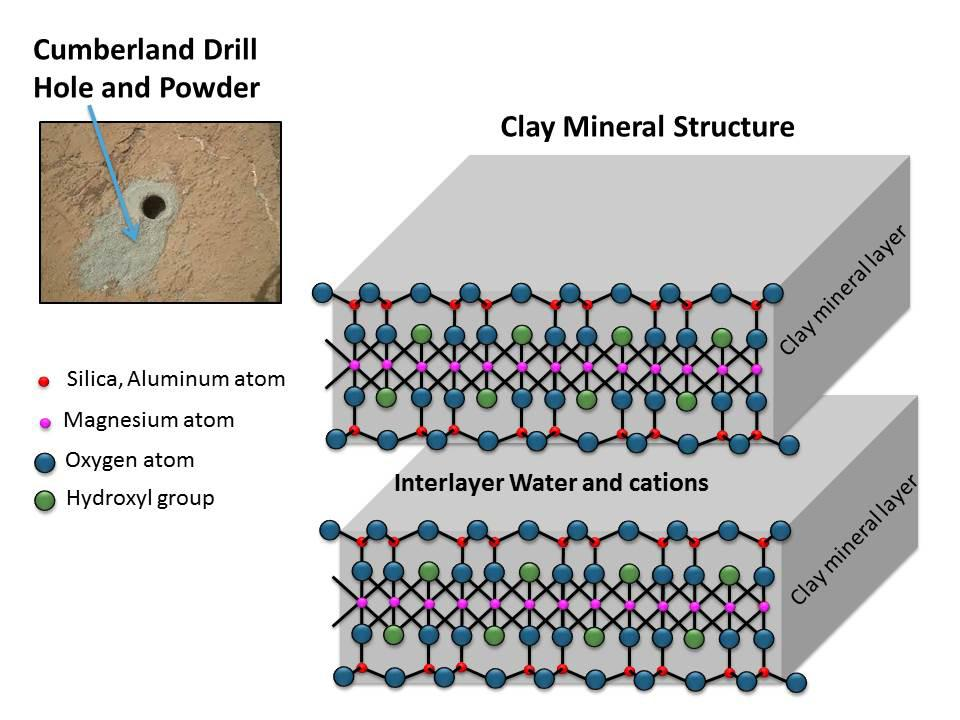
Clay mineral structure of mudstone.

The Curiosity rover examines mudstone near Yellowknife Bay on Mars (May 2013).

Gale Crater contains a number of alluvial fans and deltas that provide information about lake levels in the past. These formations are: Pancake Delta, Western Delta, Farah Vallis delta and the Peace Vallis Fan.

In a press conference on 8 December 2014, Mars scientists discussed observations by Curiosity rover that show Mars's Mount Sharp was built by sediments deposited in a large lake bed over tens of millions of years. This finding suggests the climate of ancient Mars could have produced long-lasting lakes at many places on the planet. Rock layers indicate that a huge lake was filled and evaporated many times. The evidence was many deltas that were stacked upon each other.

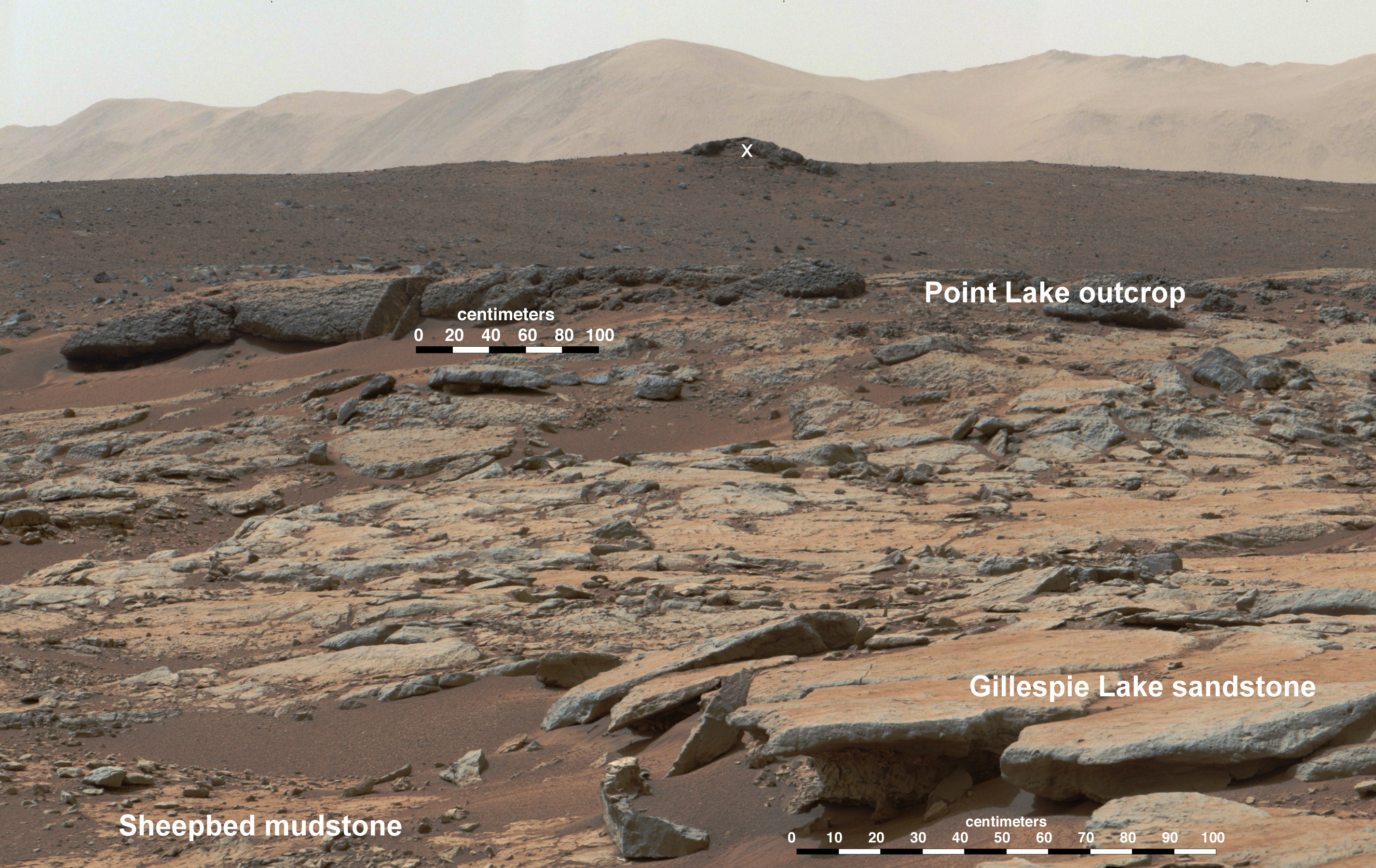
Curiosity rover - view of "Sheepbed" mudstone (lower left) and surroundings (14 February 2013).

Gale Crater is considered to be a closed-basin lake, as channels lead into it, but none lead out.

Minerals called clays and sulfates are formed only in the presence of water. They also may preserve signs of past life. The history of water at Gale, as recorded in its rocks, is giving Curiosity many clues to study as it pieces together whether Mars ever could have been a habitat for microbes. Gale is special because both clays and sulfate minerals, which formed in water under different conditions, can be observed.

Evidence of water on Mars in Gale crater

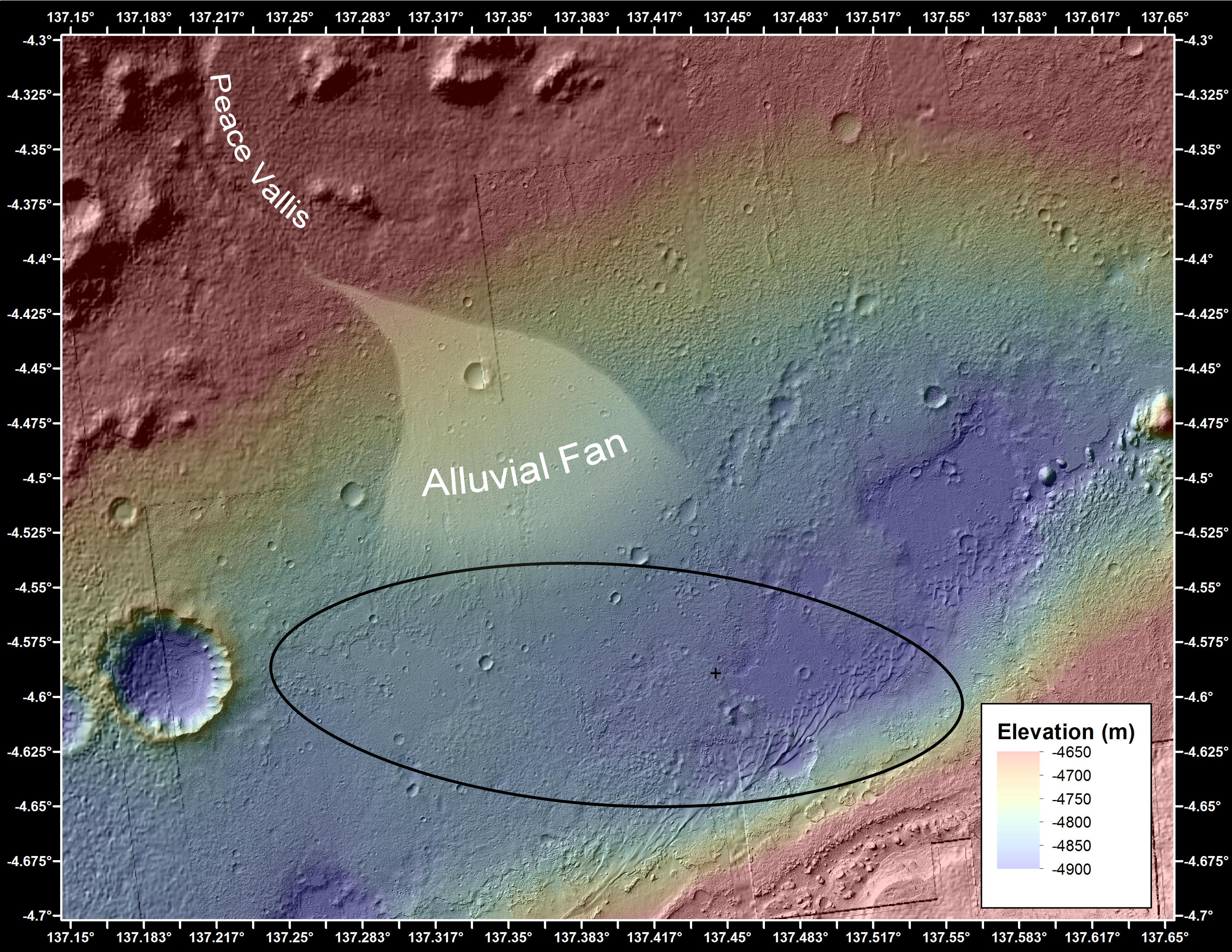
Peace Vallis and related alluvial fan near the Curiosity landing ellipse and landing site (noted by +).

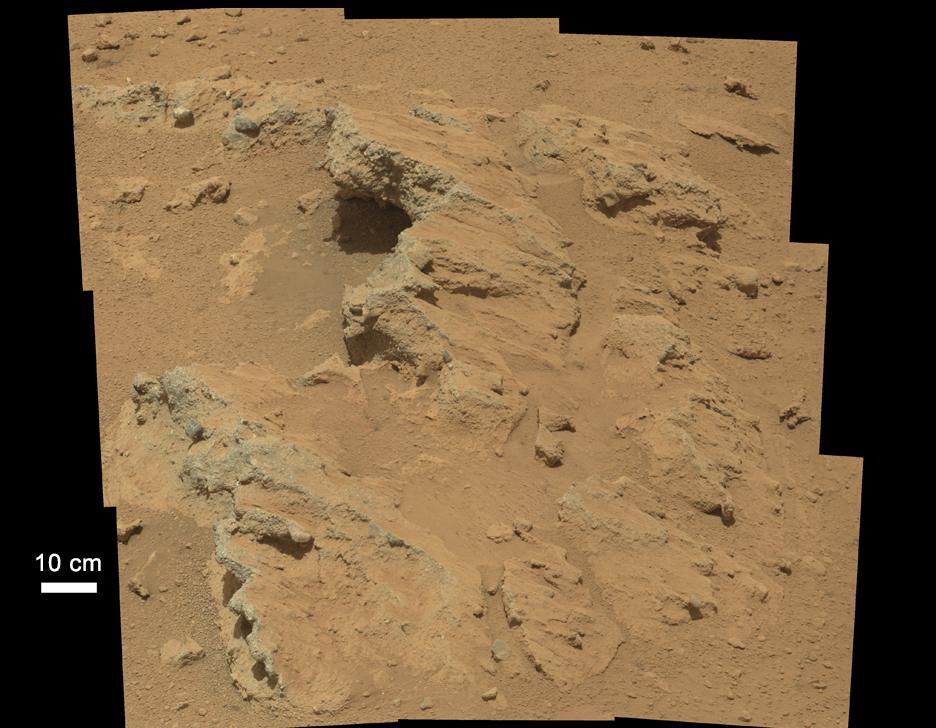
"Hottah" rock outcrop on Mars – an ancient streambed viewed by Curiosity (14 September 2012) (close-up) (3-D version).

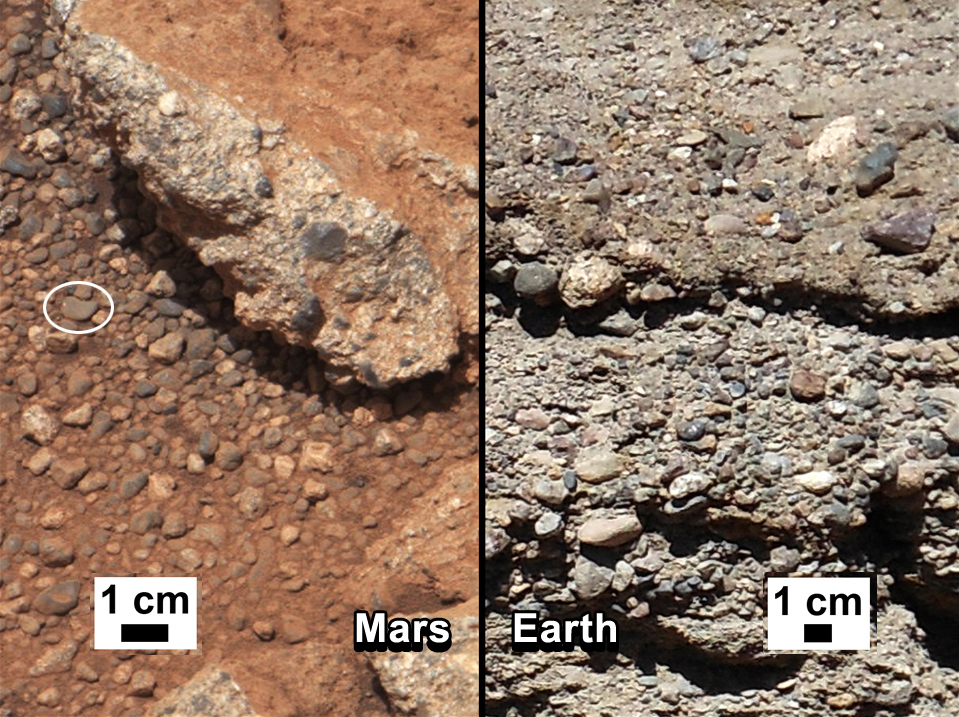
"Link" rock outcrop on Mars – compared with a terrestrial fluvial conglomerate – suggesting water "vigorously" flowing in a stream.

Curiosity on the way to Glenelg (26 September 2012).

== Holden Crater ==
Holden
- Crater Holden based on THEMIS day-time image
- Planet: Mars

Uzboi Vallis
- Uzboi Vallis based on THEMIS day-time image
- Length: 366.0
- Naming: Dry riverbed in Russia.

Holden is a 140 km wide crater in the Margaritifer Sinus quadrangle. It is named after Edward Singleton Holden, an American astronomer, and the founder of the Astronomical Society of the Pacific.

Like some other craters on Mars, Holden has an outlet channel, Uzboi Vallis, that runs into it. Some features in the crater, especially lake deposits, seem to have been created by flowing water.

The crater's rim is cut with gullies, and at the end of some gullies are fan-shaped deposits of material transported by water. The crater is of great interest to scientists because it has some of the best-exposed lake deposits. One of the layers has been found by the Mars Reconnaissance Orbiter to contain clays.

Clays only form in the presence of water. It is suspected that great amount of water went through this area; one flow was caused by a body of water larger than Earth's Lake Huron. This happened when water burst through a crater rim that was damming it. Holden is an old crater, containing numerous smaller craters, many of which are filled with sediment. Indeed, over 150 m of sediment is exposed in Holden Crater, especially in southwestern part of the crater. The crater's central mountain is also obscured by sediment. Much of the sediment probably originated from river and lake deposits. Holden Crater is in the Uzboi-Landon-Morava (ULM) outflow system.

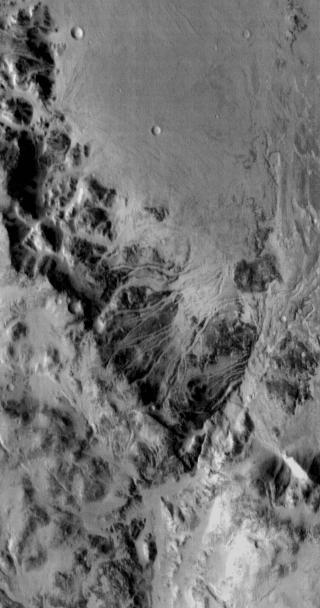
Close-up of Channels on Rim of Holden Crater, as seen by THEMIS. Image is located in the Margaritifer Sinus quadrangle.

=== Geologic history of Holden Crater ===
Studies of the whole region around Holden Crater have resulted in an understanding of a complex sequence of events that shaped the crater, which included two different lakes. A large series of rivers called the Uzboi-Ladon-Morava (ULM) system drained water from the Argyre Basin, site of a large lake. When an impact occurred and produced Holden Crater, the system was blocked by a crater rim almost a kilometer in height. Eventually water from drainage from the walls, with possibly a contribution from groundwater, collected to make the first lake. This lake was deep and long lasting. The lowest level of sedimentary rocks was deposited in this lake. Much water was inbounded in Uzboi Vallis because the rim of Holden Crater blocked the flow. Some of the backed up water came from Nirgal Vallis which had a discharge of 4800 cubic meters/second. At a certain point the stored water broke through the rim of Holden and created a second, shorter lived lake 200–250 m deep. Water with a depth of at least 50 m entered Holden at a rate that 5–10 times the discharge of the Mississippi River. Terraces and the presence of large rocks (tens of meters across) support these high discharge rates.

== Western Elysium Planitia Paleolake ==
There is evidence for a large lake in Western Elysium; however, some researchers think large lava flows can explain the terrain. The basin of this supposed lake has an area of more than 150 km^{2} and is covered with fractured plates and sinuous ridges that look like pack-ice on the Earth. Sorted patterned ground and erosion patterns in polygonal terrain in the region support ice-rich material; hence a lake. Also, the presence of streamlined islands, cataracts, and dendritic channel systems suggest formation by water from a lake. Some surfaces here show "Rootless cones" which are mounds with pits. They can be caused by explosions of lava with ground ice when lava flows on top of ice-rich ground. The ice melts and turns into a vapor that expands in an explosion that produces a cone or ring. Features like these are found in Iceland, when lavas cover water-saturated substrates. The western Elysium Planitia basin can be described as almost a perfect equipotential surface because it slopes only about 10 m over a 500 km distance—that's about as level as the Earth's ocean. This very gentle slope argues against a lava flow. In places, it has been found that the flow surface has been lowered by 50% which is expected if the flow was of water, but not if it were lava. The maximum depth of the lake was estimated to be between 31 and 53 m.

The Western Elysium Paleolake is in the southern part of the Elysium quadrangle, south of the Elysium volcanic field and near Cerberus Fossae. It has been proposed that the water for this paleolake emerged from troughs in Cerberus Fossae. Several ideas have been advanced to explain the exact mechanism, including groundwater discharge and a dike penetrating a cryosphere,

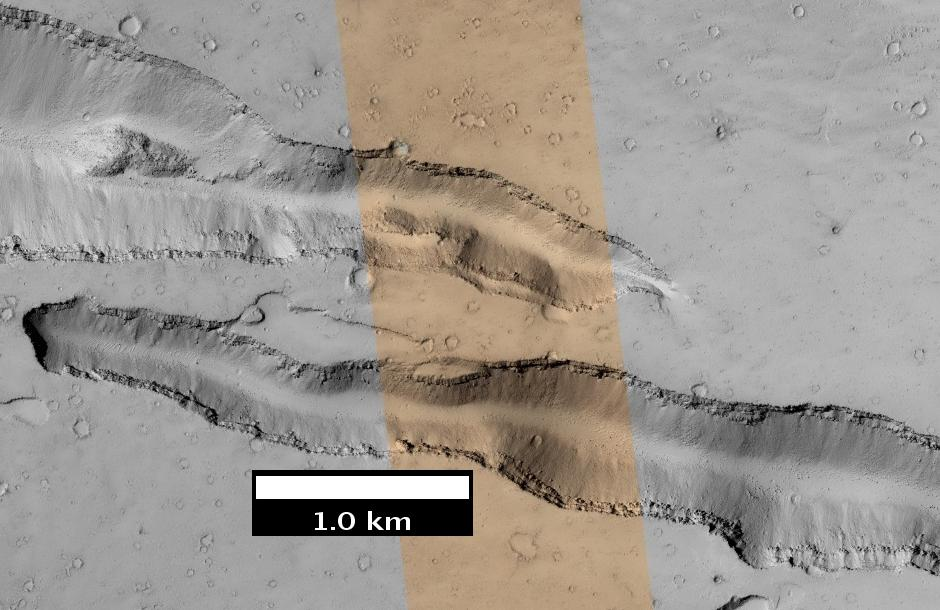
Troughs of the Cerberus Fossae group, as seen by HiRISE under the HiWish program.

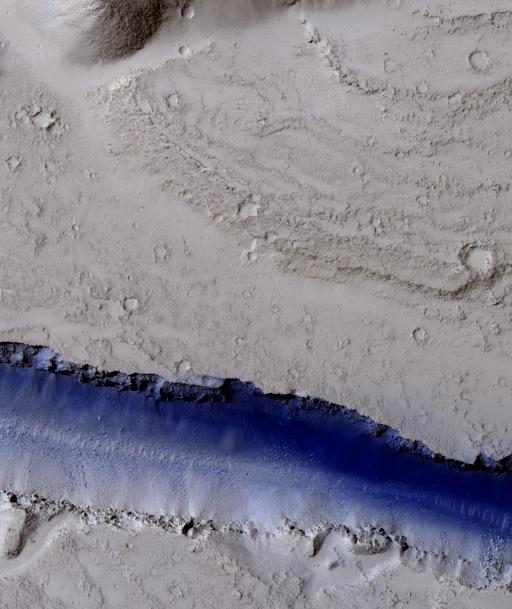
Portion of a trough (fossa) in Elysium, as seen by HiRISE under the HiWish program. This is an enlargement of a previous image. Troughs are part of the Cerberus Fossae group.

== Argyre basin ==
The Argyre basin was created by a giant impact that occurred 70 million years after the Hellas impact. It is suspected to have contained a lake early in the history of Mars. The Argyre basin is in the Argyre quadrangle. At least three river valleys (Surius Vallis, Dzigal Vallis, and Palacopus Vallis) drain into it from the south. After the Argyre lake froze solid, the ice formed eskers which are visible today. An article written by 22 researchers in Icarus concluded that the impact that formed the Argyre basin probably struck an ice cap or a thick permafrost layer. Energy from the impact melted the ice and formed a giant lake that eventually sent water to the North. The lake's volume was equal to that of Earth's Mediterranean Sea. The deepest part of the lake may have taken more than a hundred thousand years to freeze, but with the help of heat from the impact, geothermal heating, and dissolved solutes it may have had liquid water for many millions of years. Life may have developed in this time. This region shows a great deal of evidence of glacial activity with flow features, crevasse-like fractures, drumlins, eskers, tarns, aretes, cirques, horns, U-shaped valleys, and terraces. Because of the shapes of Argyre sinuous ridges, the authors concluded that they are eskers.

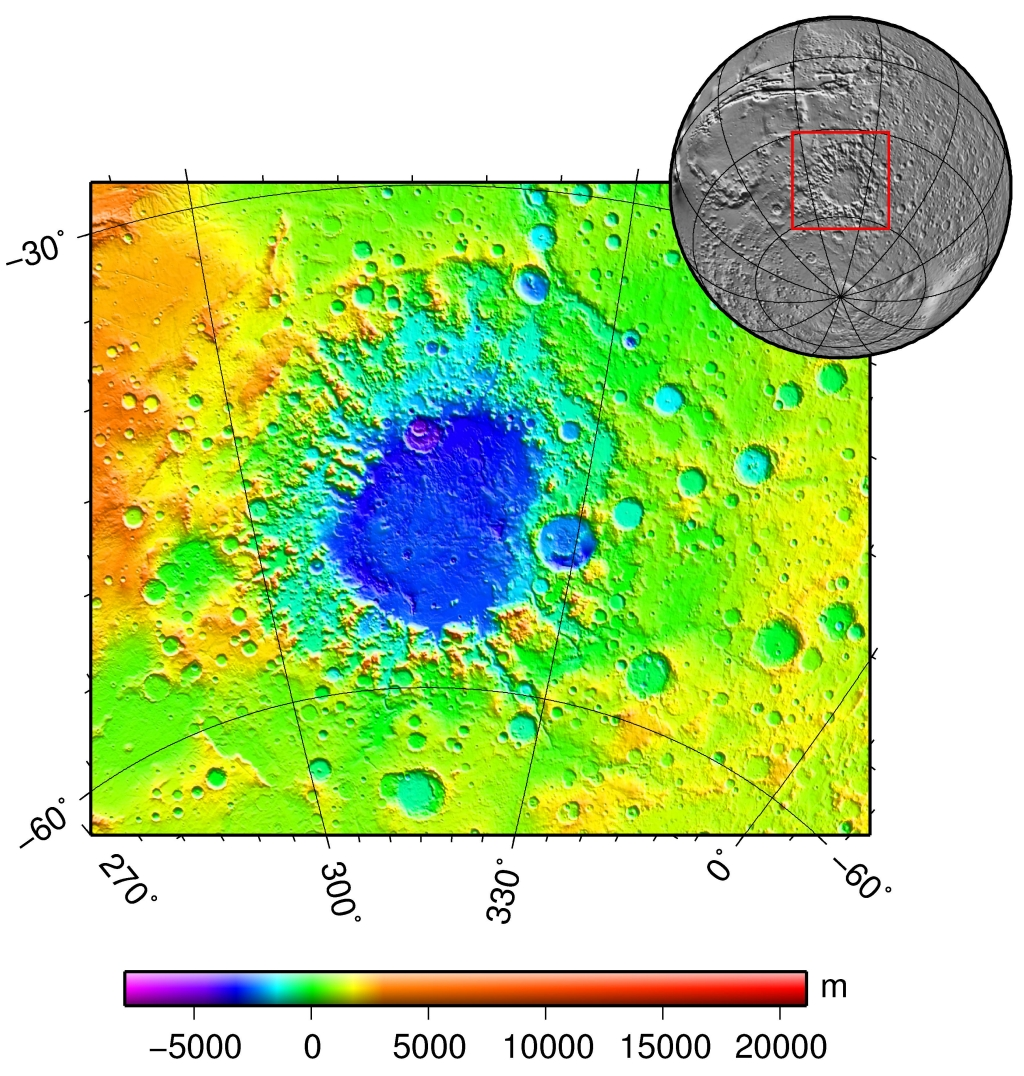
MOLA maps showing the geographic context of Argyre.

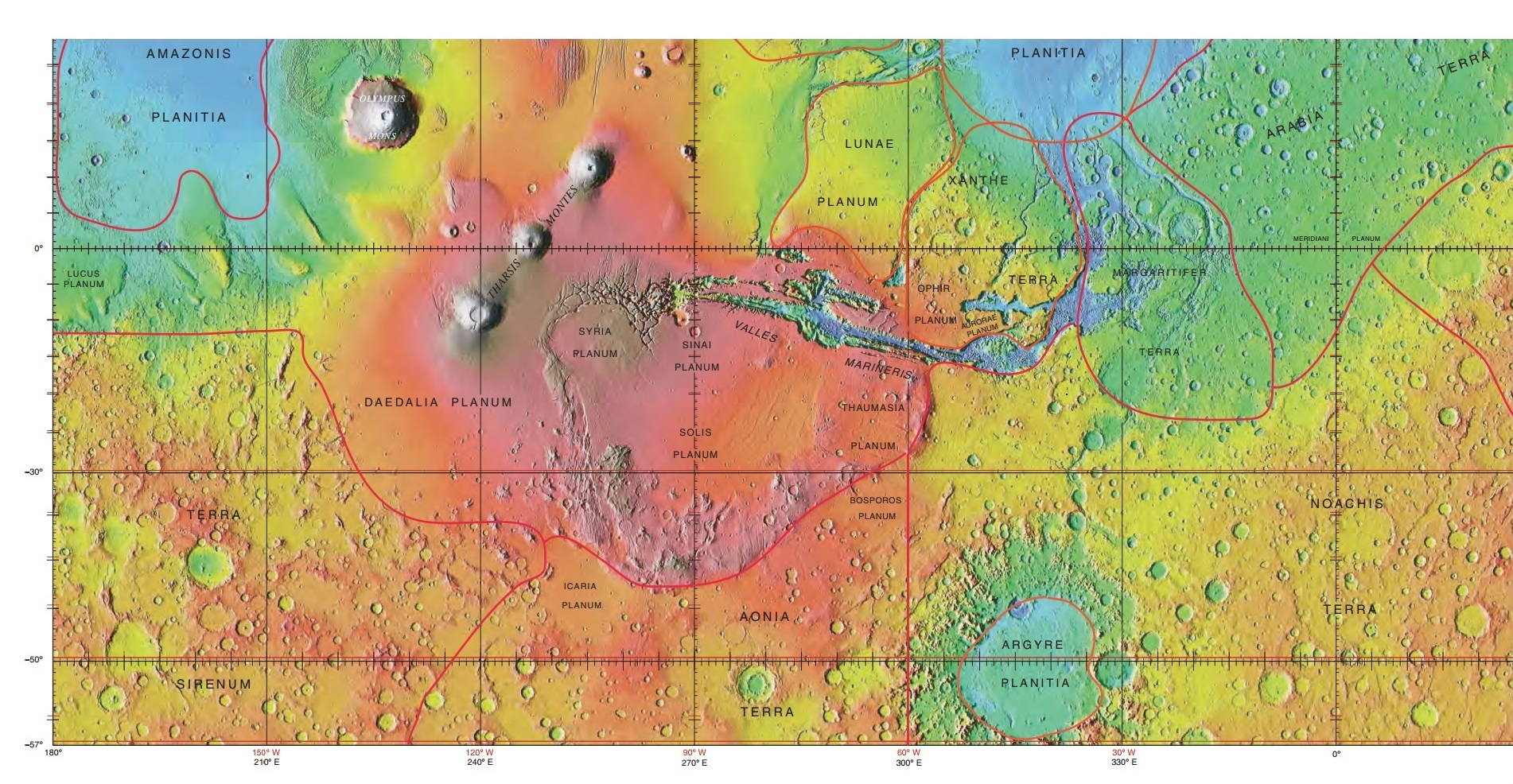
MOLA map showing boundaries for Argyre Planitia and other regions

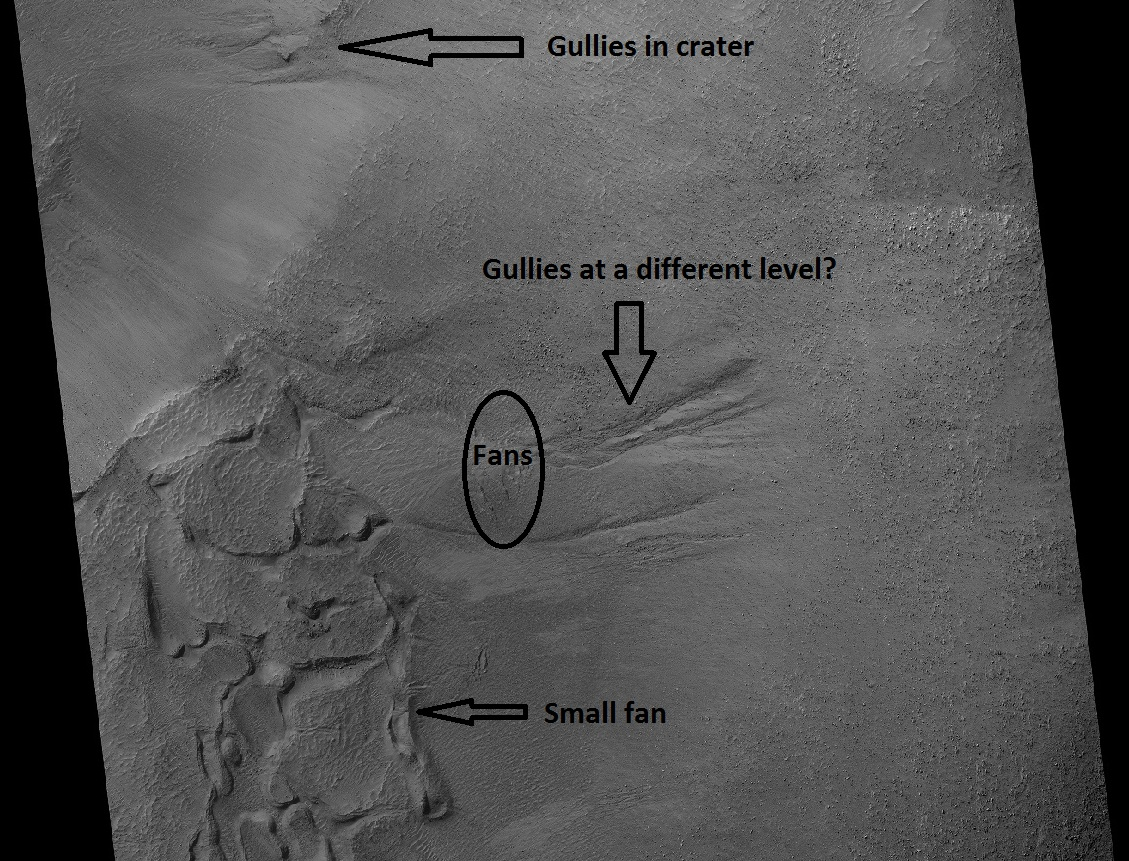
Scene in Argyre quadrangle with gullies, alluvial fans, and hollows, as seen by HiRISE under HiWish program. Enlargements of parts of this image are below.

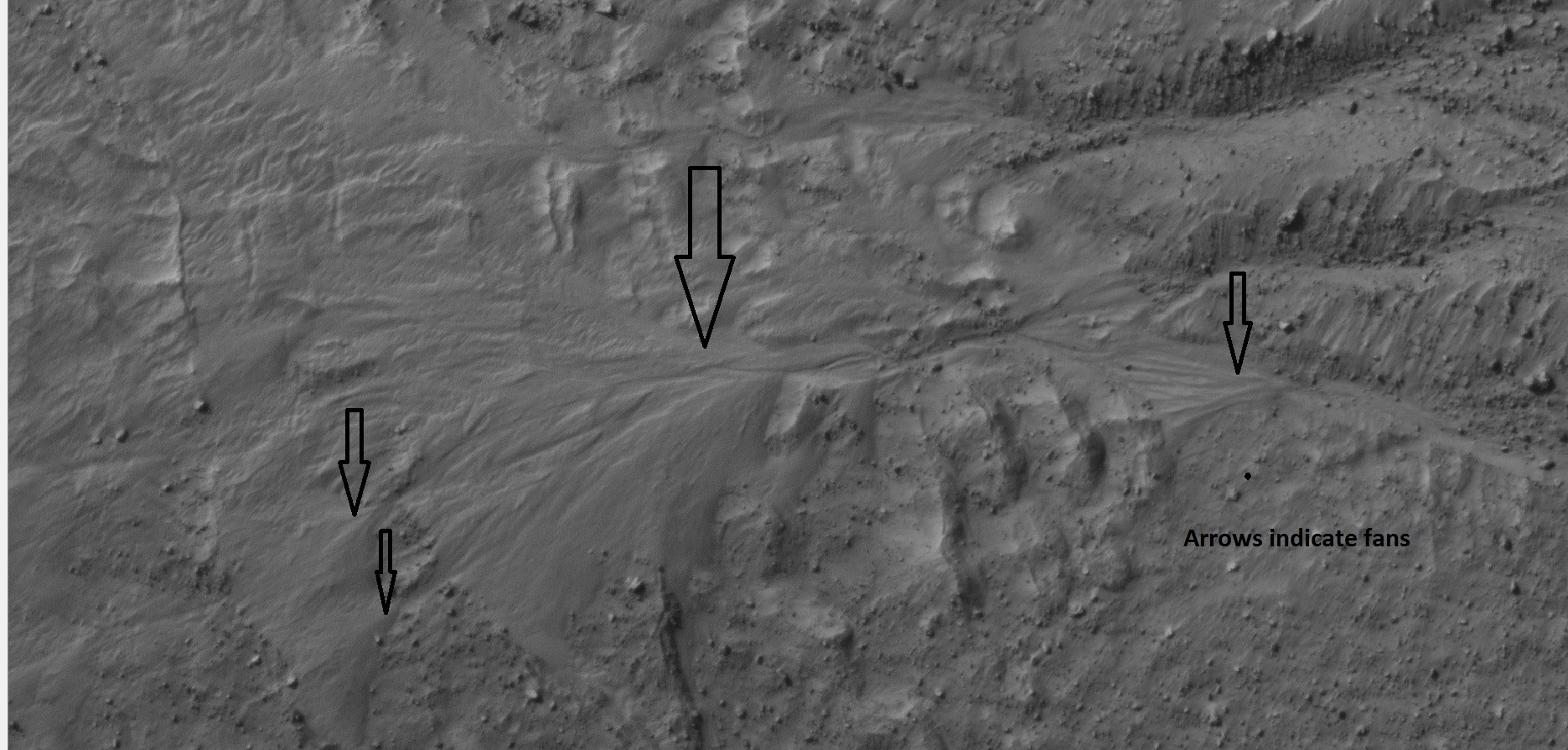
Several levels of alluvial fans, as seen by HiRISE under HiWish program. Locations of these fans are indicated in the previous image. Fans are formed with the action of water.

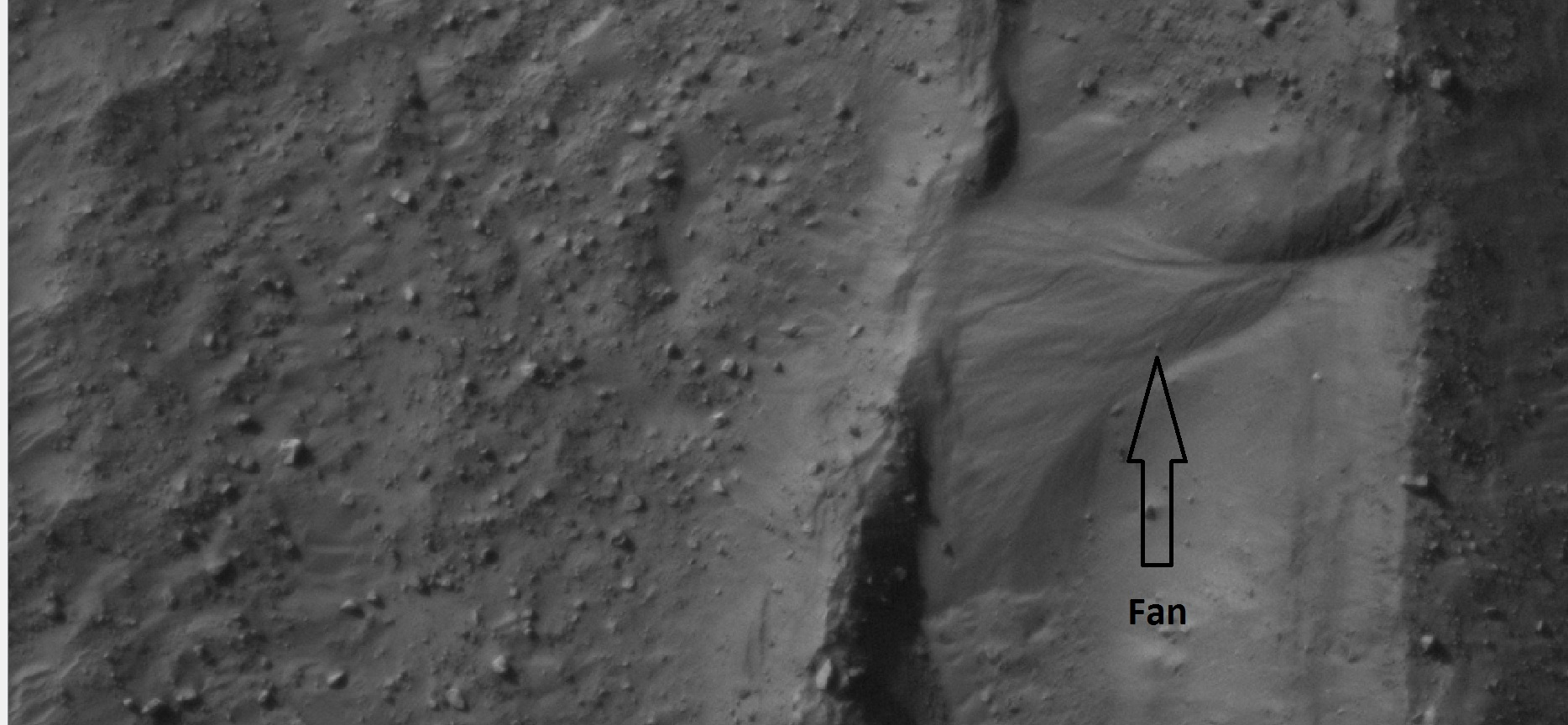
Small, well-formed alluvial fan, as seen by HiRISE under HiWish program. Location of this fan is shown in an image displayed above. Water is involved with fan formation.

== Ritchey crater ==
Ritchey is a crater in the Coprates quadrangle. It is 79 km in diameter and was named after George W. Ritchey, an American astronomer (1864–1945). There is strong evidence that it was once a lake. Ritchey Crater has been suggested as a landing site for a Mars Rover. A thick sequence of sedimentary deposits that include clay is found in the crater. Clay deposits indicate that water was probably present for a time. The presence of fluvial features along crater wall and rim, as well as alluvial/fluvial deposits, support the idea of much water being present at some time in the past.

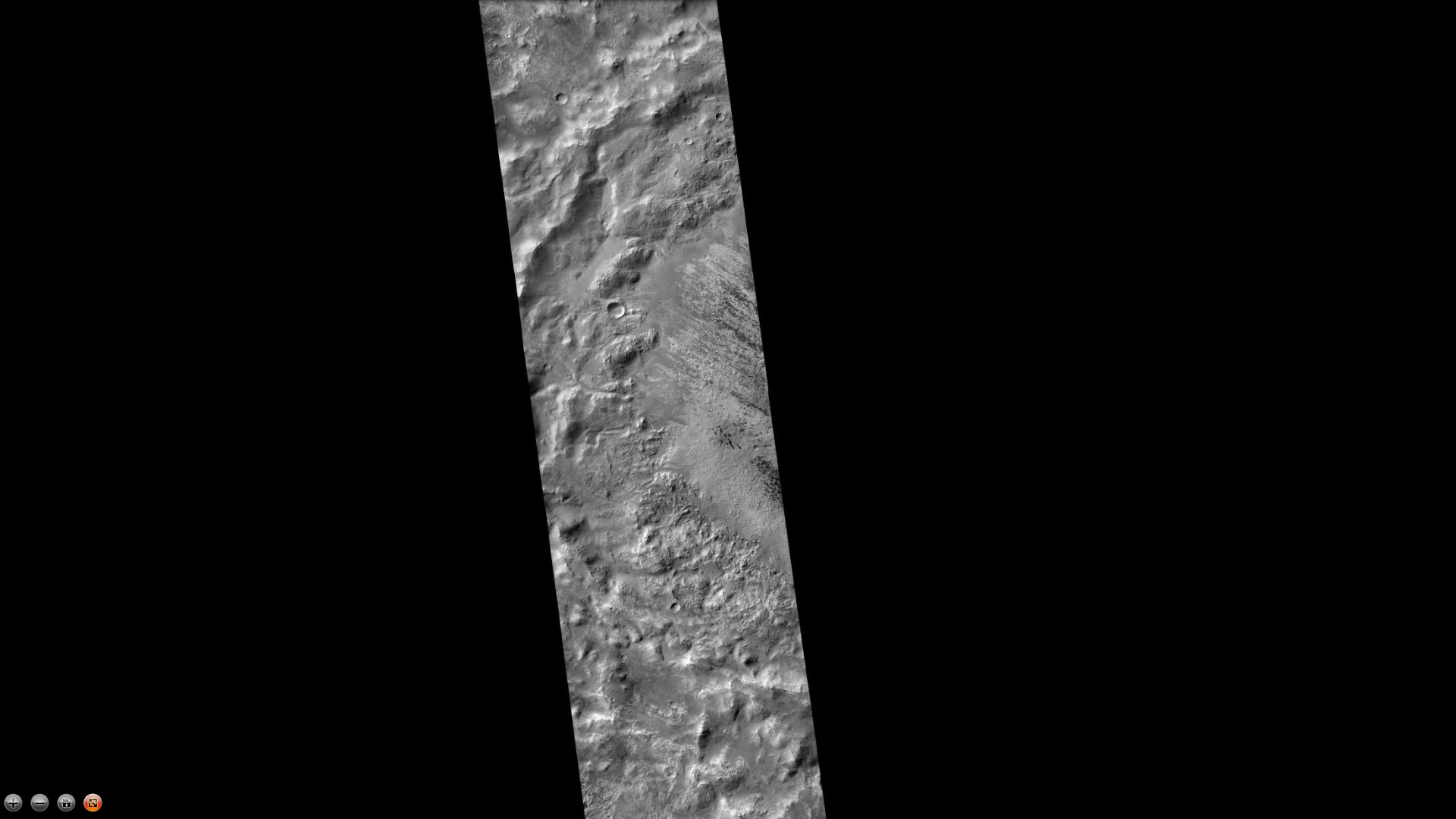
Western side of Ritchey Crater, as seen by CTX camera (on Mars Reconnaissance Orbiter).

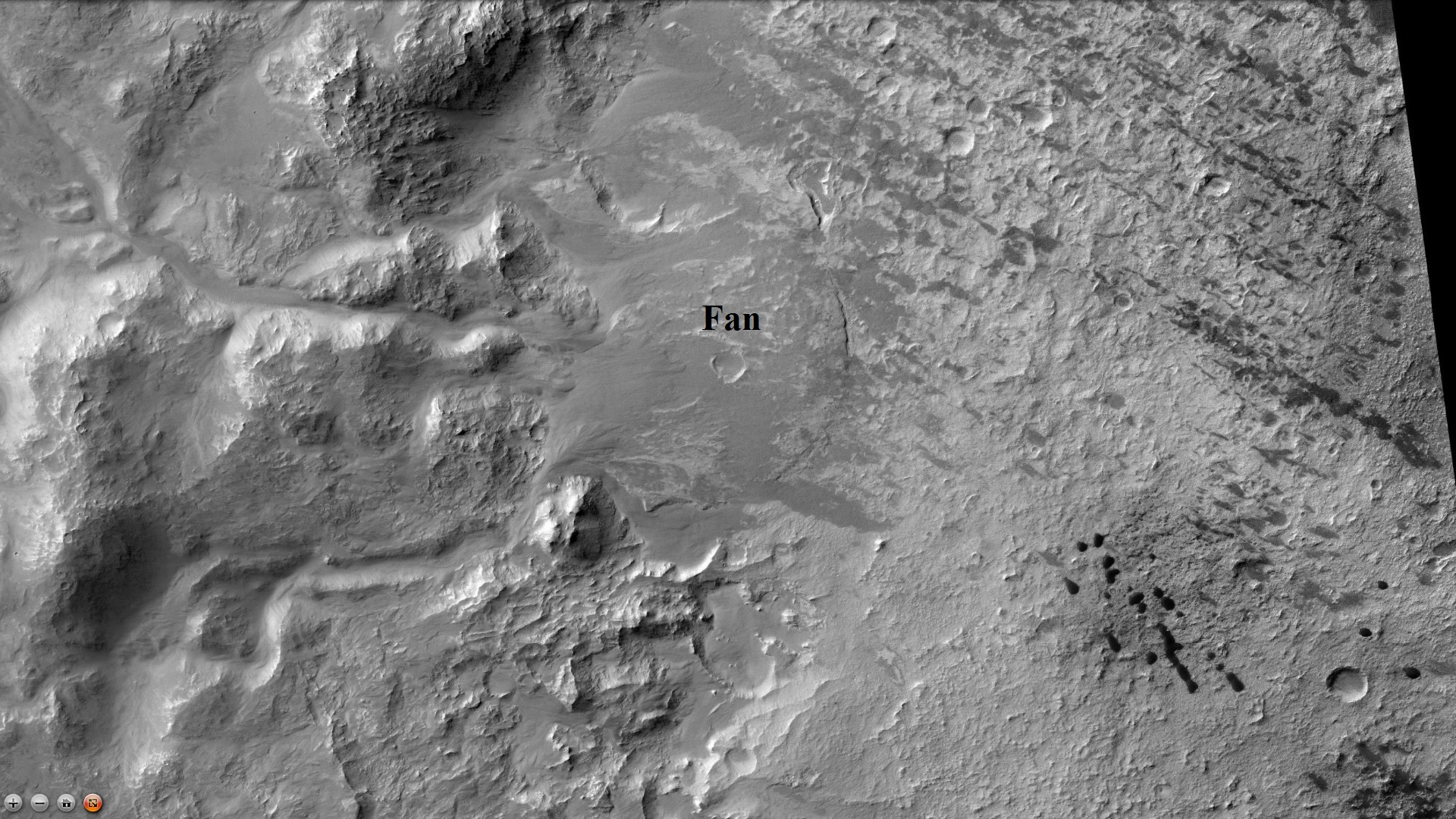
Fan along western wall of Ritchey Crater, as seen by CTX camera (on Mars Reconnaissance Orbiter). Note: this is an enlargement of previous image.

== Jezero Crater ==
Jezero crater
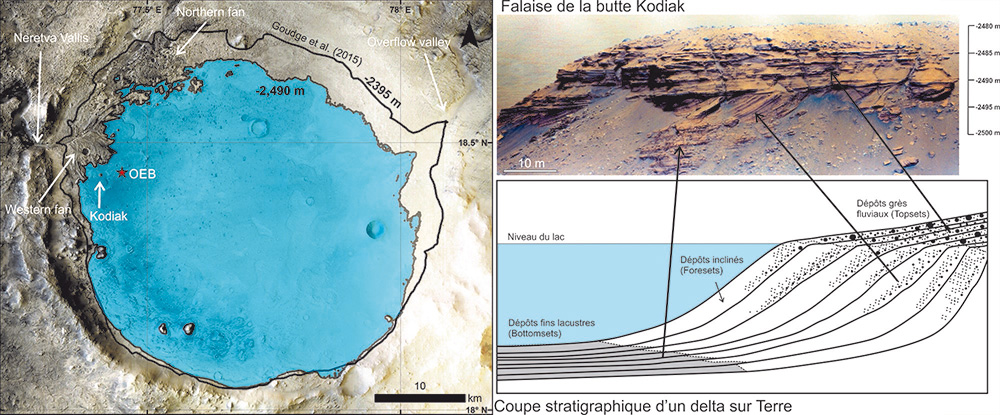
- Estimations of the Jezero crater lake level as of 2021
- Diameter: 49.0 km (30.4 mi)
- Eponym: Jezero, meaning "lake" in Slavic languages

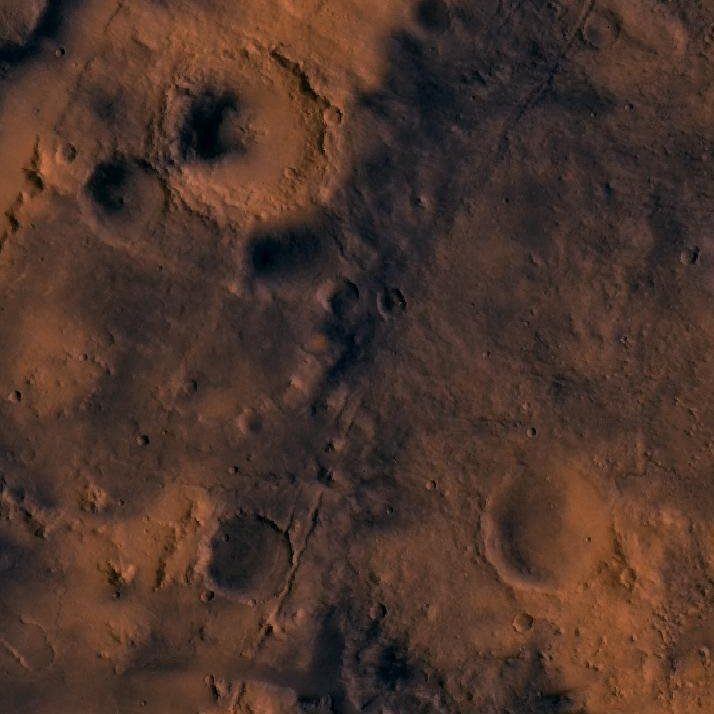
Viking 1 Orbiter

Jezero is a crater on Mars located at 18.855°N 77.519°E in the Syrtis Major quadrangle. The diameter of the crater is about 49.0 km (30.4 mi). Thought to have once been flooded with water, the crater contains a fan-delta deposit rich in clays.

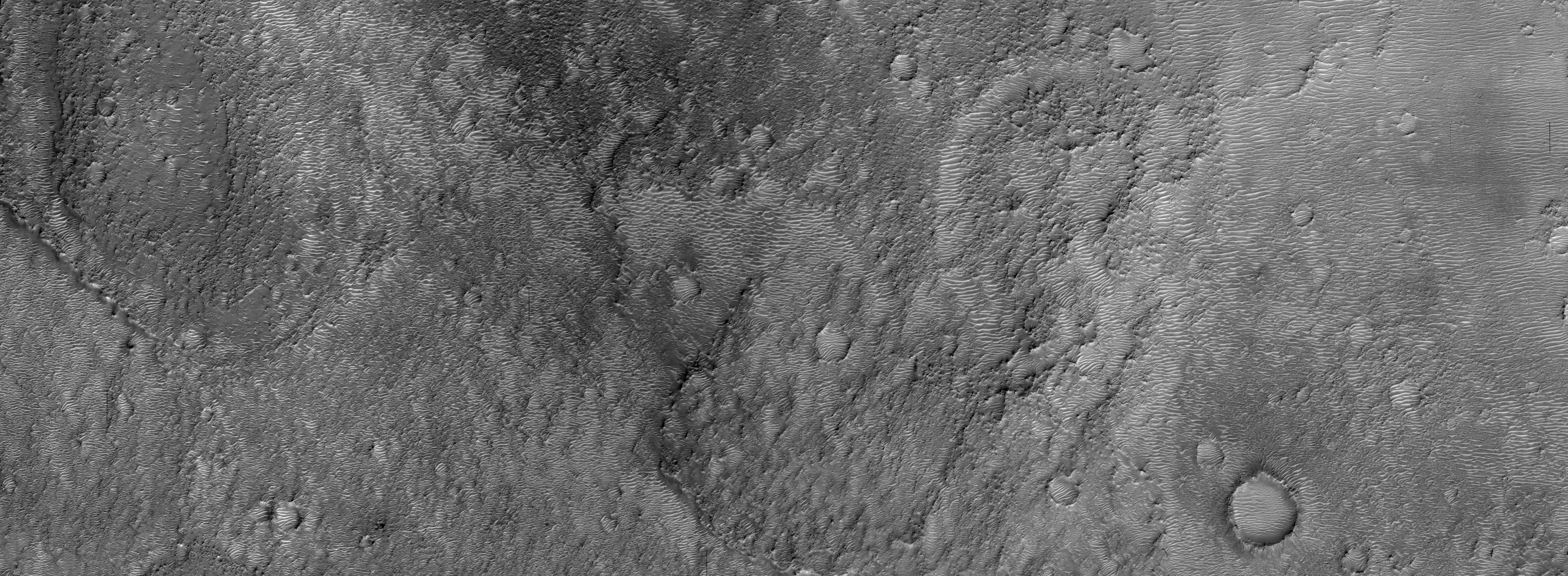
Mars 2020 landing site inside Jezero crater.

Jezero crater, once considered a site for the Mars Science Laboratory, is the landing site for the Perseverance Mars rover. Clay minerals have been detected in and around the crater. The Mars Reconnaissance Orbiter identified smectite clays. Clays form in the presence of water, so this area probably once held water and maybe life in ancient times. The surface in places are cracked into polygonal patterns. Such shapes often form when clay dries out.

Researchers described in a paper, released in March 2015, how an ancient Martian lake system existed in Jezero Crater. The study advanced the idea that water filled the crater at least two separate times. There are two channels on the northern and western sides of the crater that probably supplied it with water; both of these channels have delta-like deposits near the landing site where sediment was carried by waterband deposited in the lake. Pictures show layers and meanders.

A primary aim of the Mars 2020 mission is to search for signs of ancient life. It is hoped that a later mission could then return samples from sites identified as probably containing remains of life. To safely bring the craft down, a 12-mile (19 km) wide, smooth, flat circular area is needed. Geologists hope to examine places where water once ponded. They would like to examine sediment layers.

Studies of Jezero by the Perseverance river allowed scientists to piece together a history of the crater and maybe for other impact craters because other craters on Mars may have undergone some of the same processes. After a large impact created Jezero Crater, hot magma moved and accumulated under the ground forming what are called intrusions called sills and dikes. Since rocks contained large crystals scientist concluded that the magma underwent was very slow cooling over a long period of time. Such crystals are produced by very slow cooling. Later erosion exposed these old chambers. Lava, then came into Jezero. The basalt that was formed was detected by Perseverance. It also found carbonate minerals. These minerals meant that water came in and formed a lake. Just looking at satellite pictures of Jezero, one might guess that only minerals derived from sedimentary rocks would be found on the surface. However, several classes of rocks were formed that indicated a complex history.

== Eridania Lake ==
Eridania Lake is a theorized ancient lake with a surface area of roughly 1.1 million square kilometers. Its maximum depth is 2,400 meters and its volume is 562,000 km^{3}. It was larger than the largest landlocked sea on Earth, the Caspian Sea and contained more water than all the other martian lakes together. The Eridania sea held more than 9 times as much water as all of North America's Great Lakes. The upper surface of the lake was assumed to be at the elevation of valley networks that surround the lake; they all end at the same elevation, suggesting that they emptied into a lake.

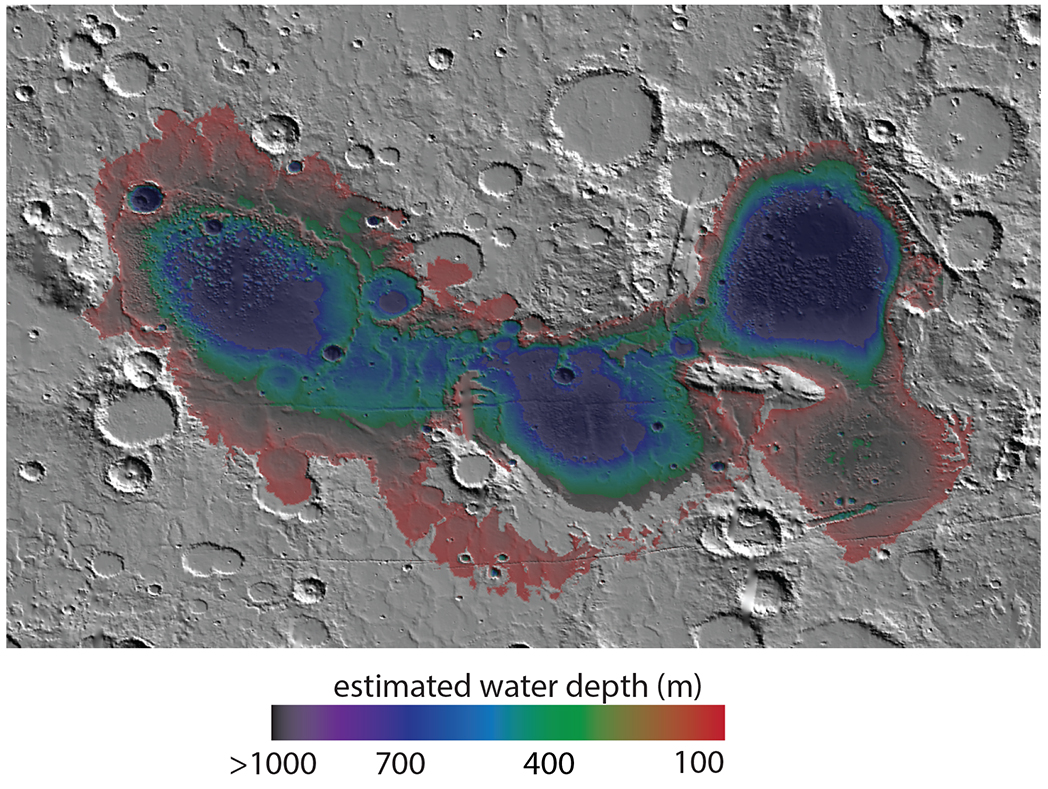
Map showing estimated water depth in different parts of Eridania Sea This map is about 530 miles across.

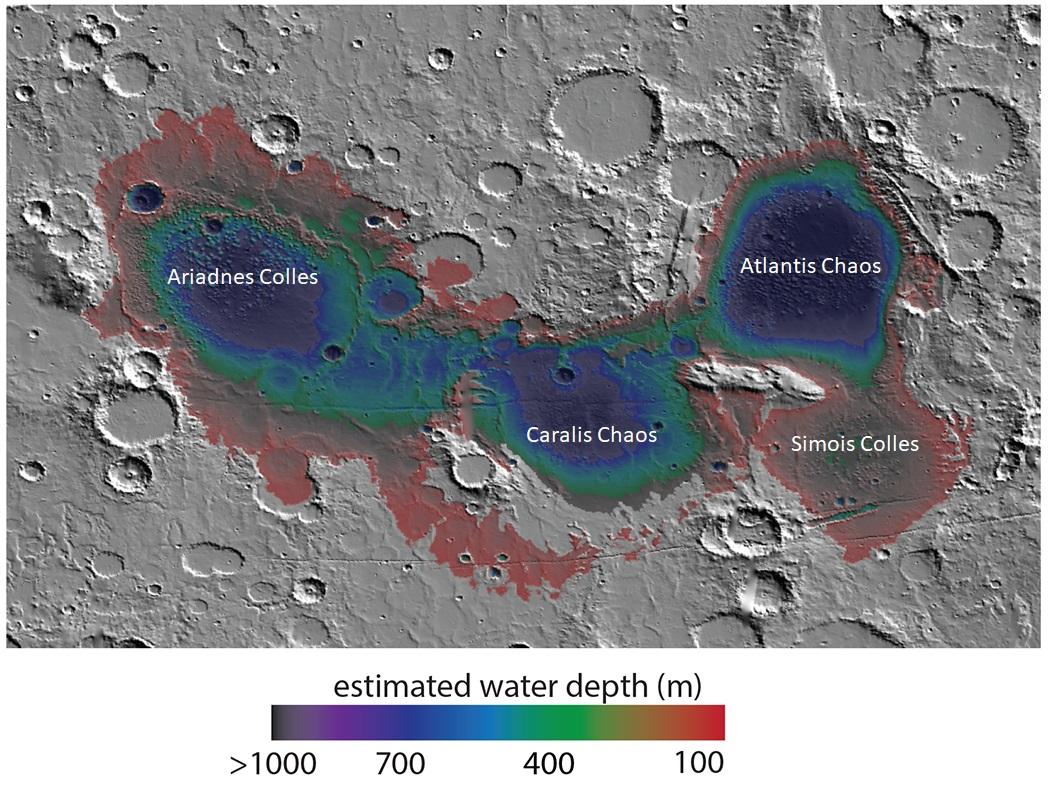
Features around Eridania Sea labeled

Three basins make up the lake Ariadnes (centered at 175 E, 35 S), Atlantis (Centered at 182 E, 32 S), and Gorgonum (Centered at 192 E, 37 S). It is located at the source of the Ma'adim Vallis outflow channel and extends into Eridania quadrangle and the Phaethontis quadrangle. As Eridania Lake dried out in the late Noachian epoch it divided into a series of smaller lakes. Clays which require water for their formation have been found within the borders of this supposed lake. They were identified as Mg/Fe-bearing phyllosilicates and Al-rich phyllosilicates, using with hyperspectral data from CRISM. Further study, published in 2016, using both OMEGA (Visible and Infrared Mineralogical Mapping Spectrometer on Mars Express) and CRISM found that a capping layer lies above an Al-rich clay layer (probably Al-smectite and/or kaolins). Beneath this layer is Fe-rich clay, called nontronite smectite, and then a layer of zeolite or hydrated sulfate. Small deposits of alunite and jarosite were also discovered. The clay minerals provide favorable conditions for the preservation of past Martian life traces.

Later research with CRISM found thick deposits, greater than 400 meters thick, that contained the minerals saponite, talc-saponite, Fe-rich mica (for example, glauconite-nontronite), Fe- and Mg-serpentine, Mg-Fe-Ca-carbonate and probable Fe-sulphide. The Fe-sulphide probably formed in deep water from water heated by volcanoes. Such a process, classified as hydrothermal may have been a place where life began. Saponite, talc, talc-saponite, nontronite, glauconite, and serpentine are all common on the seafloors on Earth. The earliest evidence of life on Earth appear in seafloor deposits that are similar to those found in the Eridania basin. So, samples of material from the Eridania may give us insight into the environment of the early Earth. Chloride deposits were found where a shoreline existed. They were deposited as water evaporated from the sea. These chloride deposits are thought to be thin (less than 30 meters), because some craters do not display the chemical in their ejecta. A crater's ejecta contains material from under the surface, therefore if the chloride deposits were very deep they would have appeared in the ejecta.

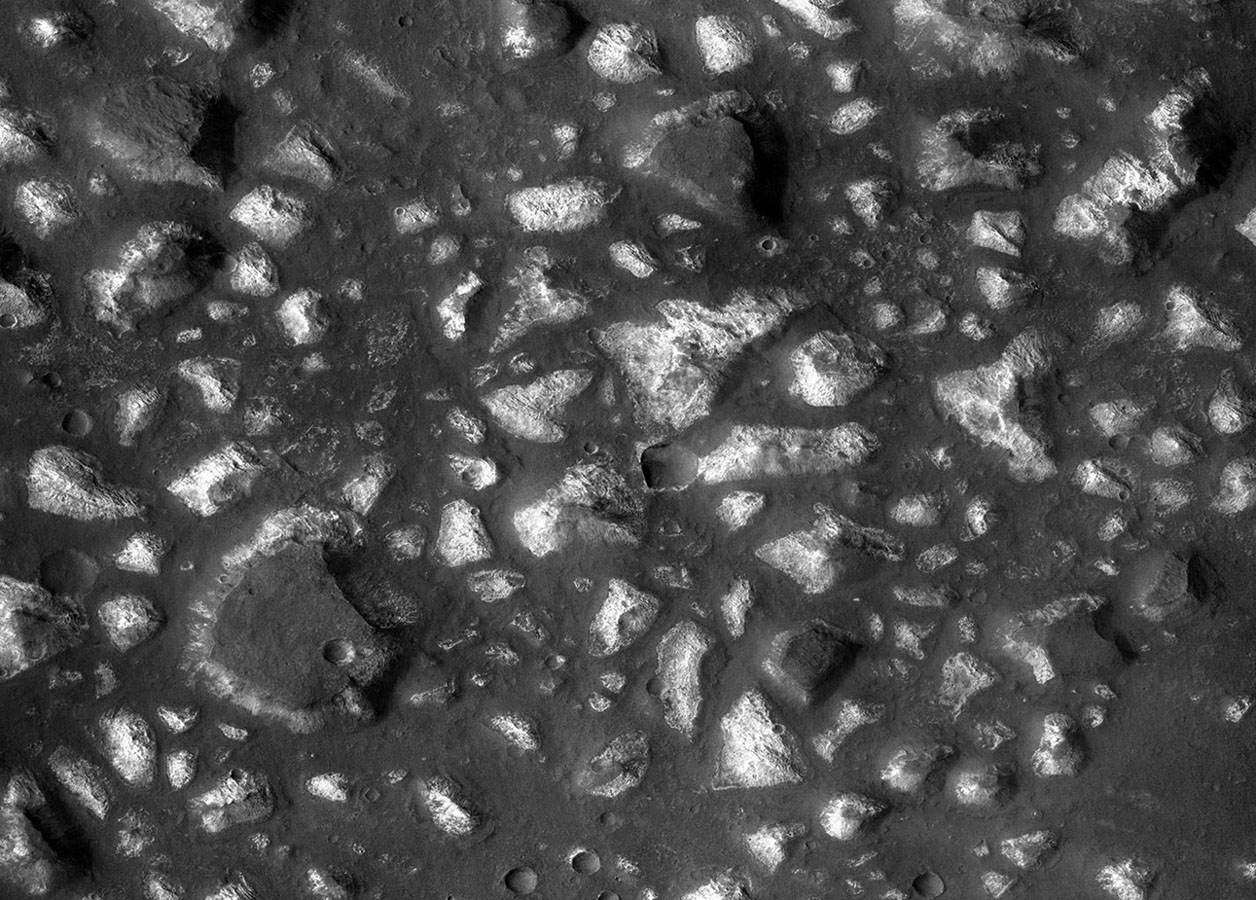
Deep-basin deposits from the floor of Eridania Sea. The mesas on the floor are there because they were protected against intense erosion by deep water/ice cover. CRISM measurements show minerals may be from seafloor hydrothermal deposits. Life may have originated in this sea.

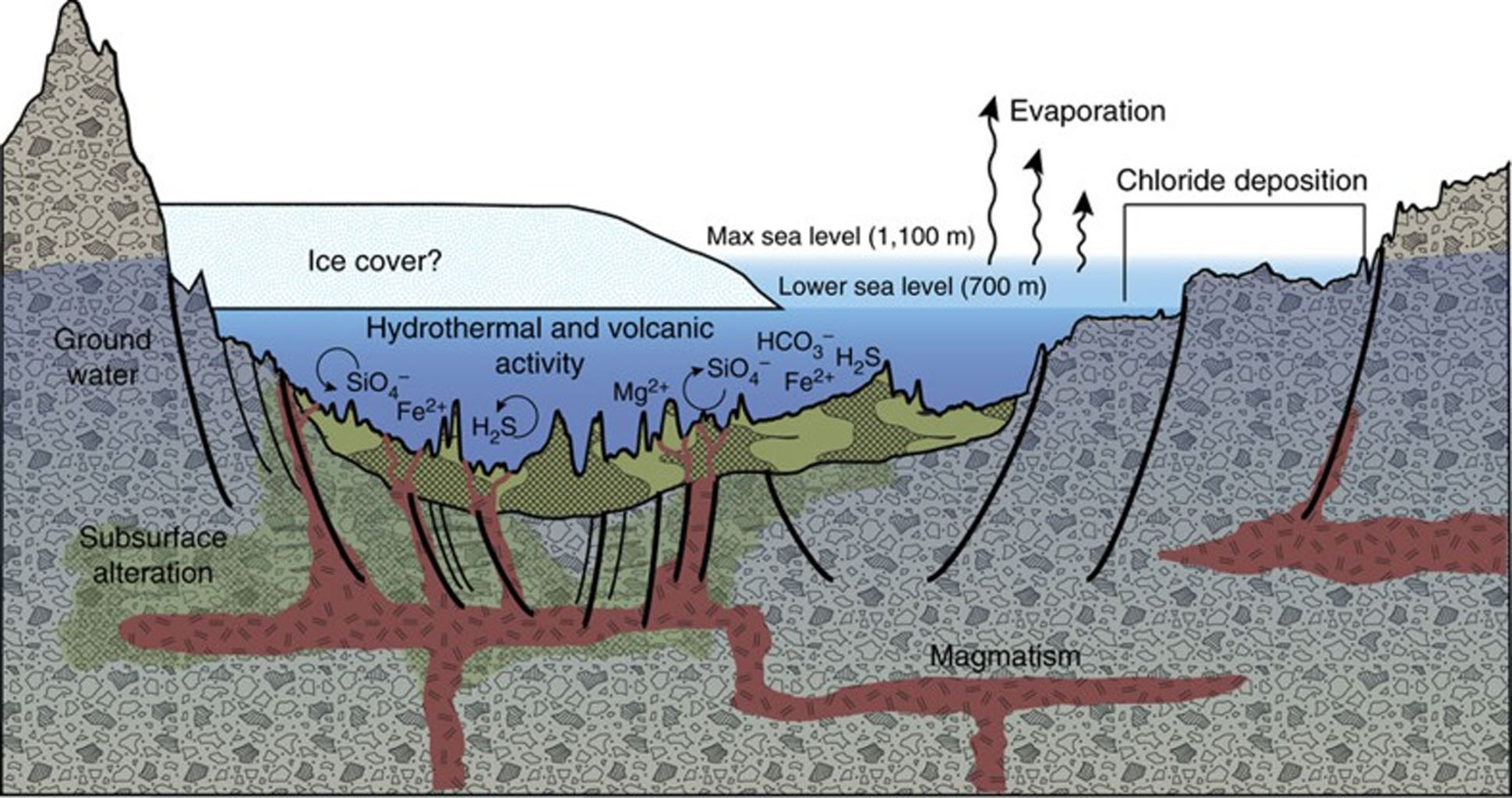
Diagram showing how volcanic activity may have caused deposition of minerals on floor of Eridania Sea. Chlorides were deposited along the shoreline by evaporation.

At a 2018 planetary science conference in Texas, a paper was presented that suggested that the deep water lake waters of Eridania may have hosted ancient life. This environment was rich in energy and chemical nutrients. The earliest evidence of life on Earth is similar to this type of deep sea environment.

== Columbus crater ==
Columbus Crater
- Columbus crater based on THEMIS day-time image
- Planet: Mars
- Diameter: 119 km
- Eponym: Christopher Columbus, Italian explorer (1451–1506)

Columbus Crater is a crater in the Memnonia quadrangle, is 119 km in diameter, and was named after Christopher Columbus, Italian explorer (1451–1506). Research with an orbiting near-infrared spectrometer, which reveals the types of minerals present based on the wavelengths of light they absorb, found evidence of layers of both clay and sulfates in Columbus crater. This is exactly what would appear if a large lake had slowly evaporated. Moreover, because some layers contained gypsum, a sulfate which forms in relatively fresh water, life could have formed in the crater. The CRISM instrument on the Mars Reconnaissance Orbiter found kaolinite, hydrated sulfates including alunite and possibly jarosite. Further study concluded that gypsum, polyhydrated and monohydrated Mg/Fe-sulfates were common and small deposits of montmorillonite, Fe/Mg-phyllosilicates, and crystalline ferric oxide or hydroxide were found. Thermal emission spectra suggest that some minerals were in the tens of percent range. These minerals suggest that water was present in the crater. Scientists are excited about finding hydrated minerals such as sulfates and clays on Mars because they are usually formed in the presence of water. Places that contain clays and/or other hydrated minerals would be good places to look for evidence of life. Sulfate minerals were found above aluminum-rich clays; this implies that early on, when the clays were formed, the water was more neutral and probably easier for life to develop. Sulfates are usually formed with more acid waters being present.

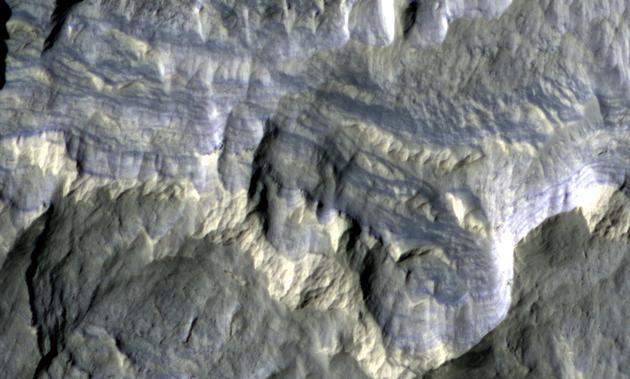
Columbus Crater Layers, as seen by HiRISE. This false-color image is about 800 feet across. Some of the layers contain hydrated minerals.

== Navua Valles ==
Navua Valles channels northeast of the Hellas Basin that may have also hosted a large, ice-covered lake in the past.

== Crater lakes ==
Many craters on Mars once were lakes. Some craters show only an inlet channel. They are called closed crater lakes. Others are called open crater lakes; they have both an inlet channel and an outflow channel.

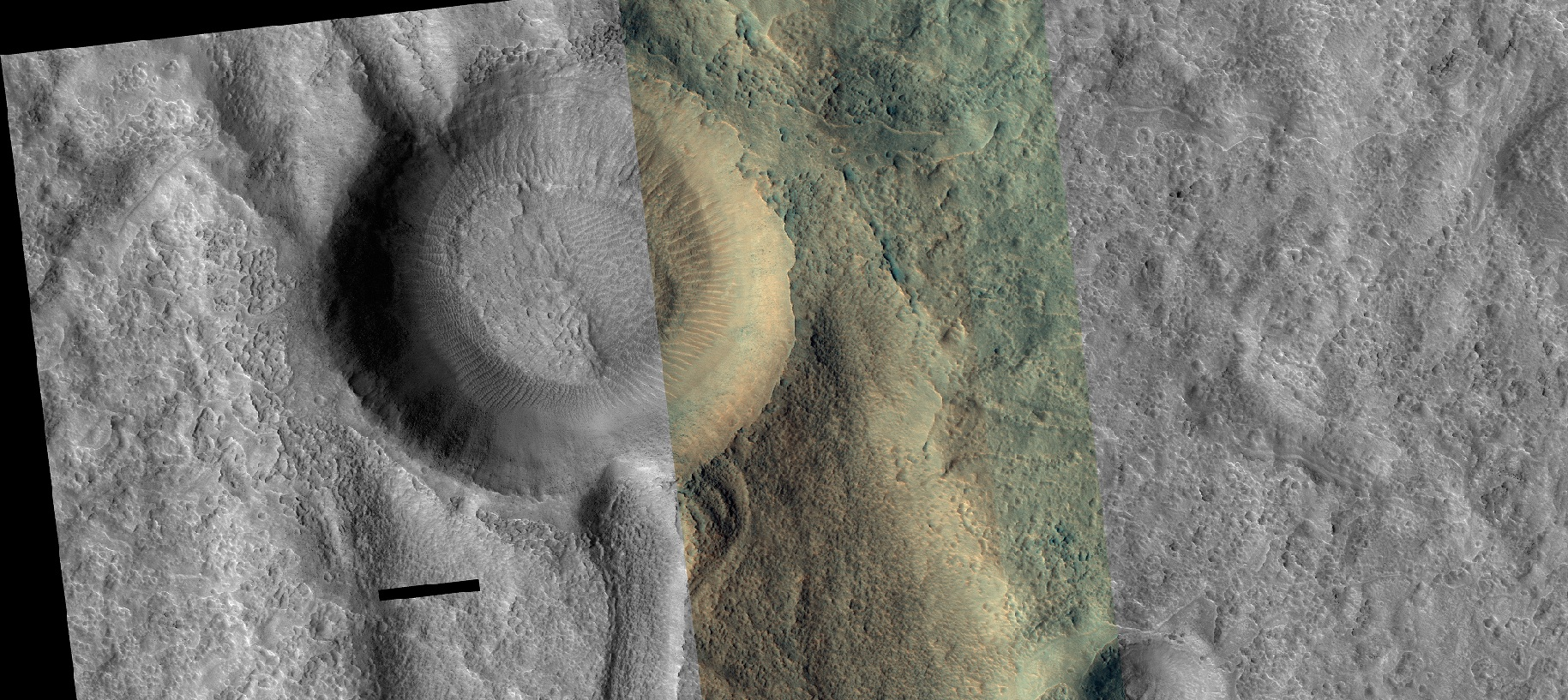
Open crater lake--it has both an inlet and outflow channel.

== Southern polar cap subglacial lake ==
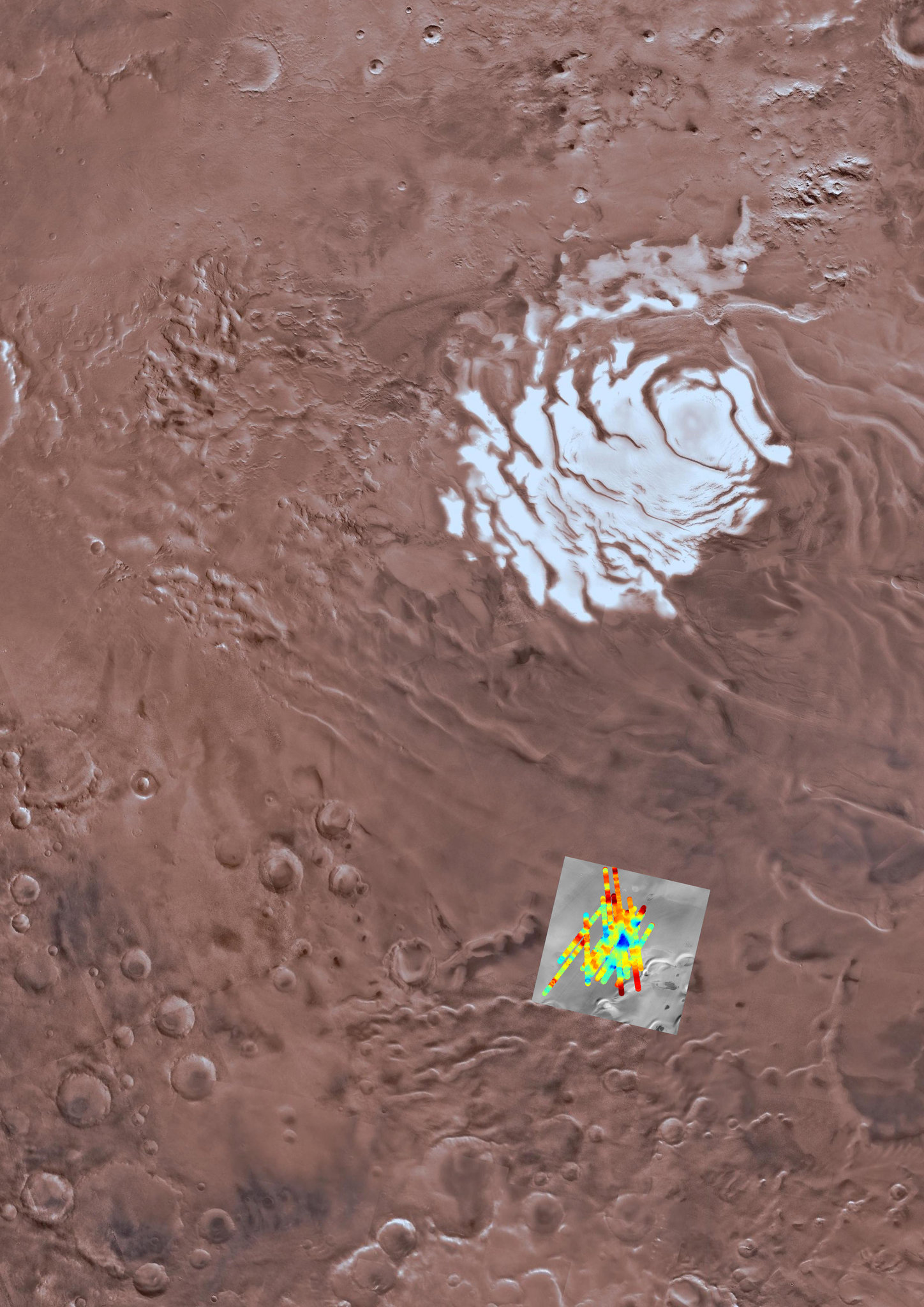
Site of south polar subglacial water body

In 2018, it was announced that a subglacial lake was discovered below the south polar ice cap of Mars. The lake was detected by Mars Express orbiter, and is 20 km (10 mi) long, lying under ca. 1.5 km (1 mi) of glacial cover, with water temperature estimated to be −68 °C (−90 °F), and having an extremely salty brine.

In September 2020, scientists confirmed the existence of several large saltwater lakes under the ice in the south polar region of the planet Mars. According to one of the researchers, "We identified the same body of water [as suggested earlier in a preliminary initial detection], but we also found three other bodies of water around the main one ... It's a complex system."

== See also ==
- Atmosphere of Mars – Gas layer surrounding Mars
- Composition of Mars – Branch of the geology of Mars
- Evidence of water on Mars found by Mars Reconnaissance Orbiter
- Extraterrestrial liquid water – Liquid water naturally occurring outside Earth
- Geological history of Mars – Physical evolution of the planet Mars
- Geology of Mars – Geology of fourth planet from the Sun
- Groundwater on Mars – Water held in permeable ground
- Lakes of Titan – Hydrocarbon lakes on Titan, a moon of Saturn
- Life on Mars – Assessments of possible life on Mars
- List of craters on Mars
- Outflow channels
- Perseverance (rover)
- Syrtis Major quadrangle
- Valley network (Mars)
- Seasonal flows on warm Martian slopes – Surface features on Mars
- Water on Mars – Study of past and present water on Mars
