= Icaria (disambiguation) =

Icaria is a Greek island.

Icaria or Ikaria may also refer to:

- Icarians, a utopian movement
- SS Ikaria, a steamship
- Icaria (wasp), a genus of wasp
- Ikaria (genus), a genus of extinct bilaterian animals
- Icaria (film), a Russian fantastic drama film
- Icaria Planum, a region of Mars
- Icaria Fossae, a system of fractures on Mars
