= Electris deposits =

The Electris deposits are 100–200 m thick, light-toned sediments on Mars. They appear to be weak because few boulders are seen associated with them. The deposit mostly covers ground from 30° S to 45° S and from 160° E to 200° E. So, some of it lies in the Phaethontis quadrangle and the rest in Eridania quadrangle. Recent work with HiRISE images lead scientists to believe that the deposit is an accumulation of loess that initially were produced from volcanic materials in Tharsis or other volcanic centers. Using a global climate model, a group of researchers headed by Laura Kerber found that the Electris deposits could have easily been formed from ash from the volcanoes Apollinaris Mons, Arsia Mons, and possibly Pavonis Mons. Its name is one of the Classical albedo features on Mars. In mythology it was the principal island of the "Electrides", islands said to produce amber.

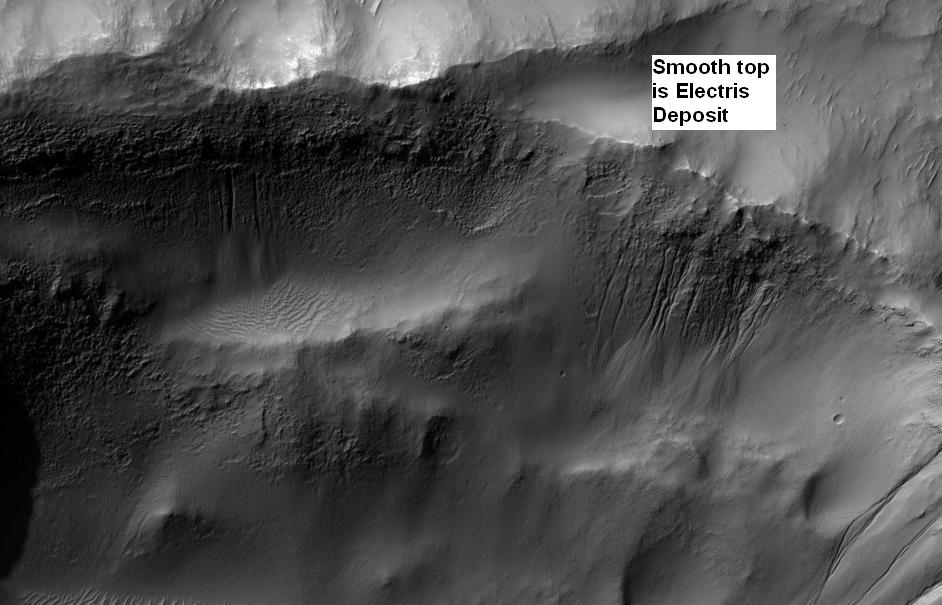
Electris deposit, as seen by HiRISE. Electris deposit is light-toned and smooth in the image in contrast to rough materials below. Location is Phaethontis quadrangle.

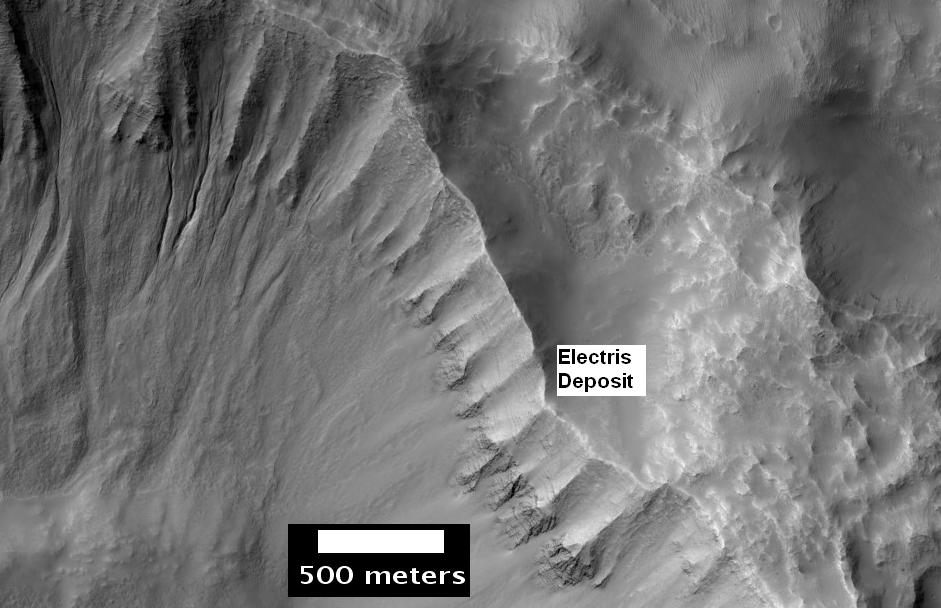
Layers in light-toned Electris deposit, as seen by HiRISE. Gullies are visible on the left.
