= Phaethontis quadrangle =

Map of Mars

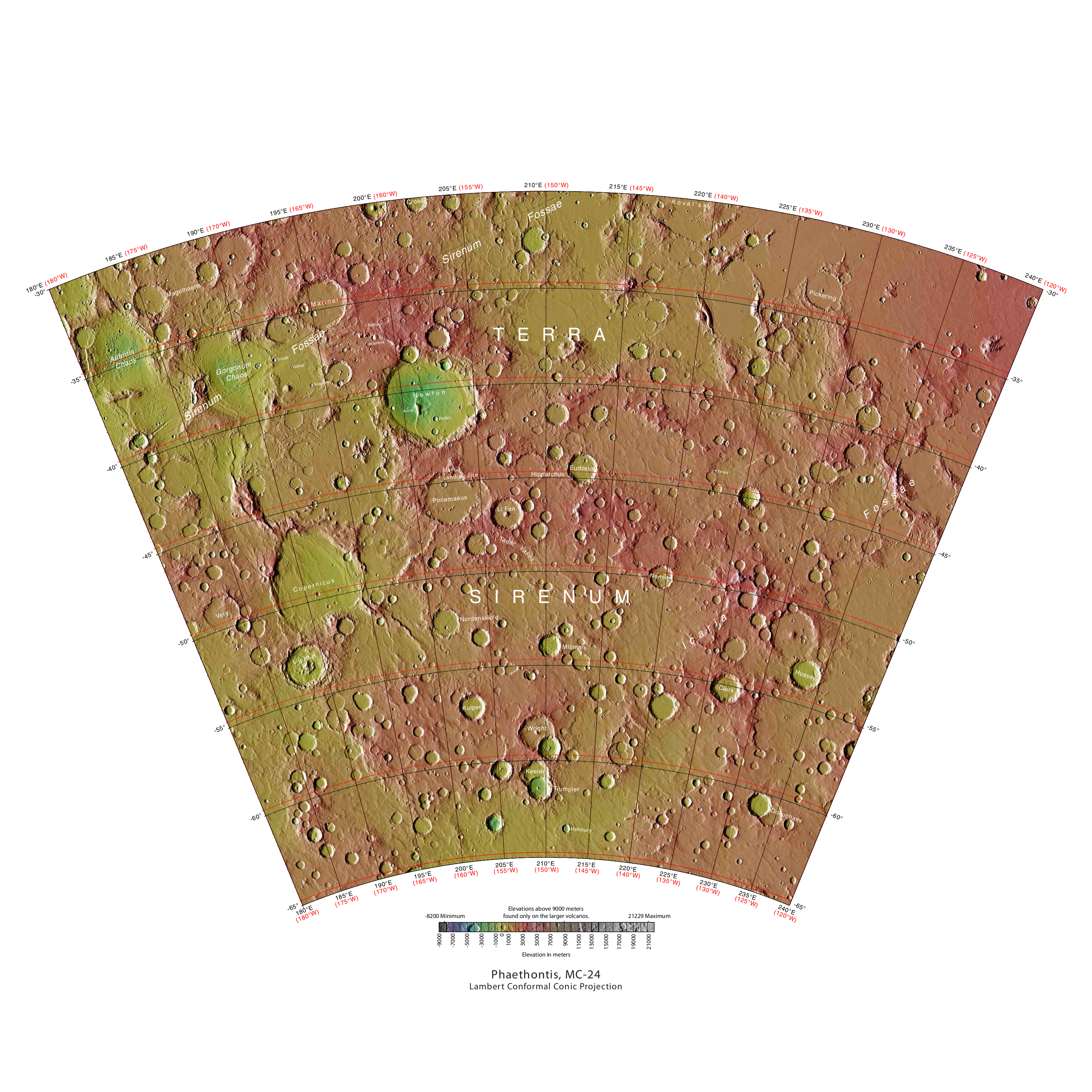
- Map of Phaethontis quadrangle from Mars Orbiter Laser Altimeter (MOLA) data. The highest elevations are red and the lowest are blue.
- Coordinates: 47.5°S 150°W

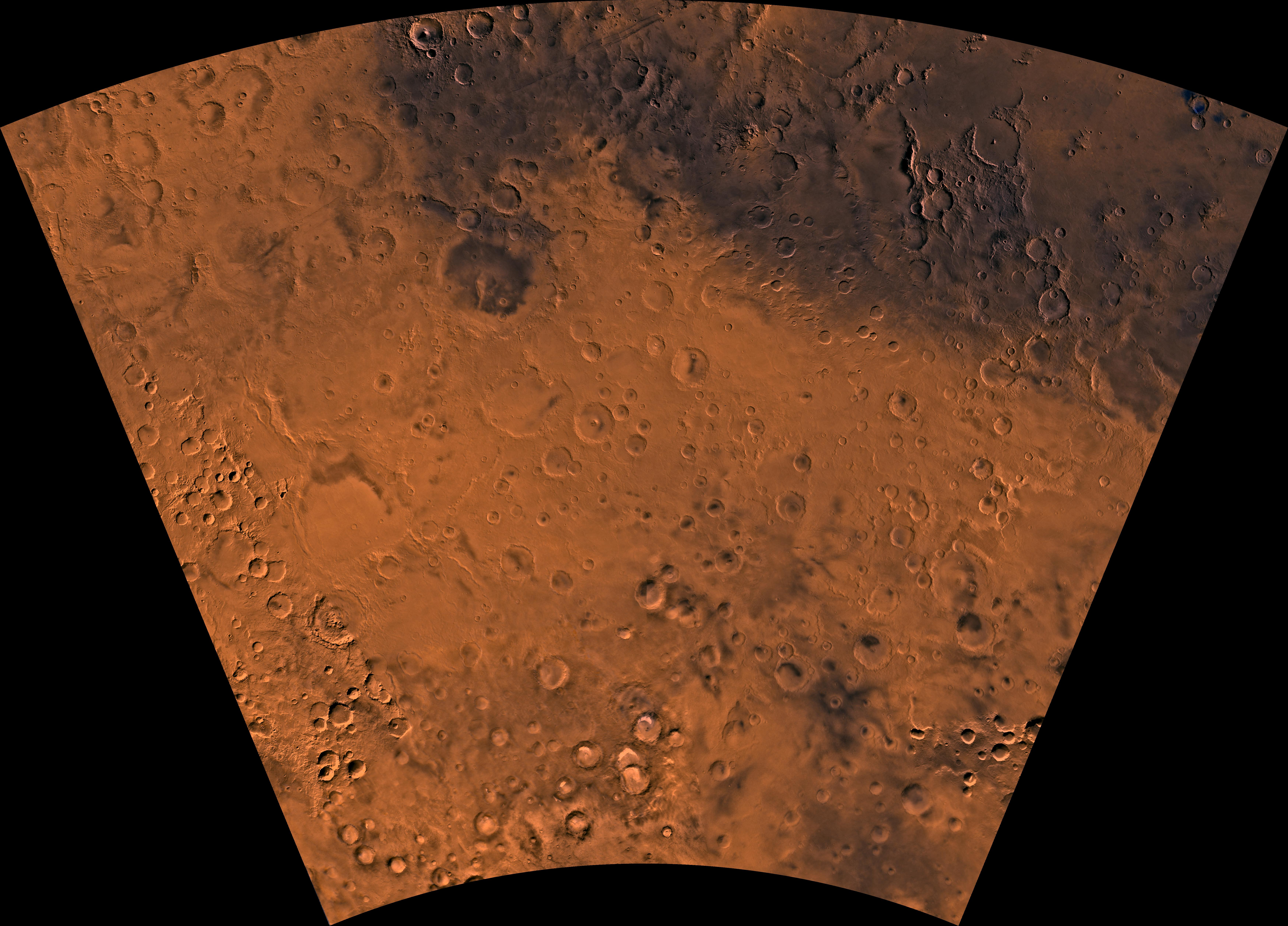
Image of the Phaethontis Quadrangle (MC-24). The region is dominated by heavily cratered highlands and low-lying areas forming relatively smooth plains.

The Phaethontis quadrangle is one of a series of 30 quadrangle maps of Mars used by the United States Geological Survey (USGS) Astrogeology Research Program. The Phaethontis quadrangle is also referred to as MC-24 (Mars Chart-24).

The name comes from Phaethon, the son of Helios.

The Phaethontis quadrangle lies between 30° and 65° south latitude and 120° and 180° west longitude on Mars. This latitude range is where numerous gullies have been discovered. An old feature in this area, called Terra Sirenum lies in this quadrangle; Mars Reconnaissance Orbiter discovered iron/magnesium smectites there. Part of this quadrangle contains what is called the Electris deposits, a deposit that is 100–200 metres (330–660 ft) thick. It is light-toned and appears to be weak because of few boulders. Among a group of large craters is Mariner Crater, first observed by the Mariner 4 spacecraft in the summer of 1965. It was named after that spacecraft. A low area in Terra Sirenum is believed to have once held a lake that eventually drained through Ma'adim Vallis. Russia's Mars 3 probe landed in the Phaethontis quadrangle at 44.9° S and 160.1° W in December 1971. It landed at a speed of 75 km per hour, but survived to radio back 20 seconds of signal, then it went dead. Its message just appeared as a blank screen.

== Electris deposits ==
The Electris deposits are light-toned sediments on Mars and are 100–200 m thick. Research using HiRISE images lead scientists to believe that the deposit is an accumulation of loess that initially were produced from volcanic materials in Tharsis or other volcanic centers. A team of researchers led by Laura Kerber found that the Electris deposits could have been formed from ash from the volcanoes Apollinaris Mons, Arsia Mons, and possibly Pavonis Mons.

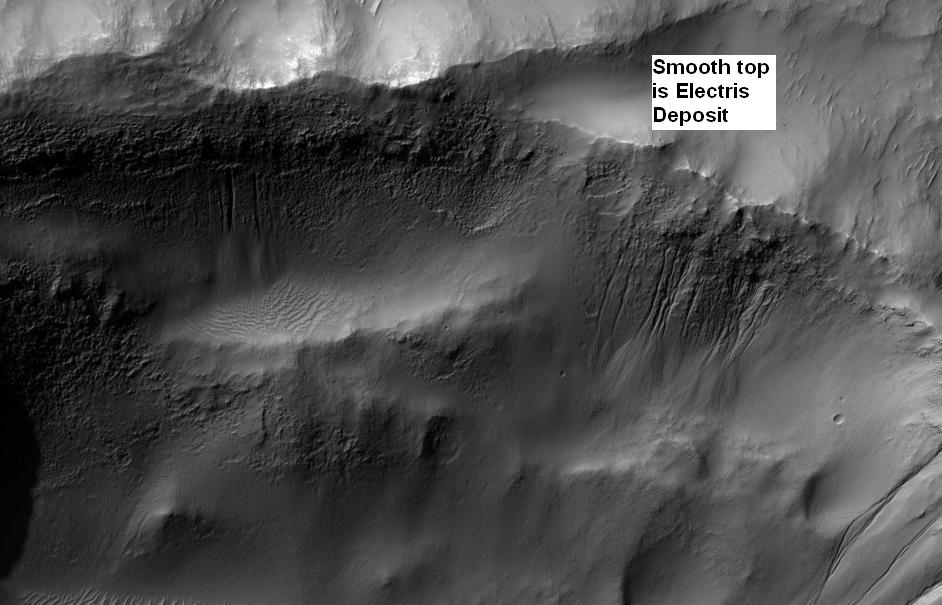
Electris Deposit, as seen by HiRISE. Electris deposit is light-toned and smooth in the image in contrast to rough materials below. Gullies are also visible.

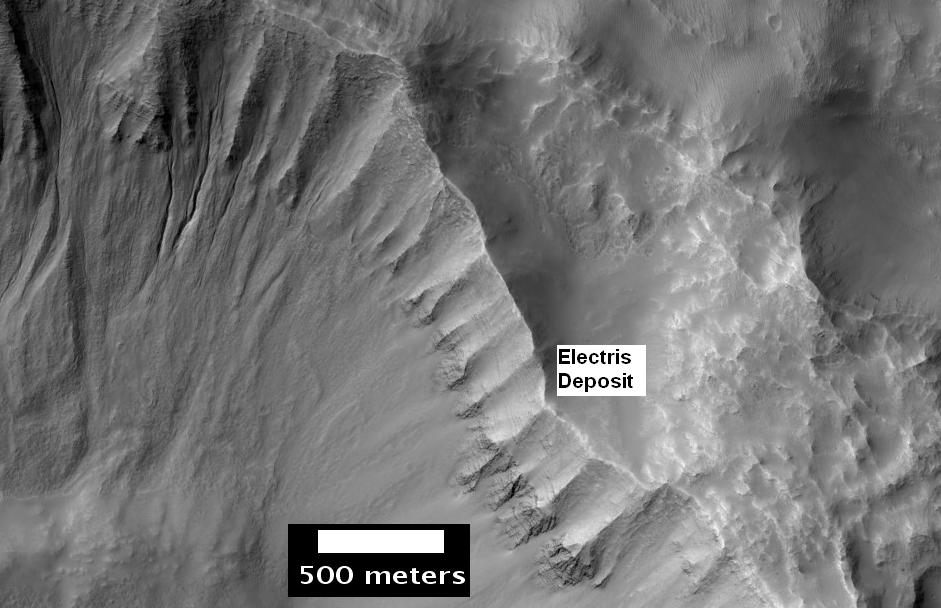
Layers in light-toned Electris Deposit, as seen by HiRISE on the Mars Reconnaissance Orbiter. Gullies are visible on the left.

== Martian gullies ==
The Phaethontis quadrangle is the location of many gullies that may be due to recent flowing water. Some are found in the Gorgonum Chaos and in many craters near the large craters Copernicus and Newton. Gullies occur on steep slopes, especially on the walls of craters. Gullies are believed to be relatively young because they have few, if any craters. Moreover, they lie on top of sand dunes which themselves are considered to be quite young. Usually, each gully has an alcove, channel, and apron. Some studies have found that gullies occur on slopes that face all directions, others have found that the greater number of gullies are found on poleward facing slopes, especially from 30–44° S.

Although many ideas have been put forward to explain them, the most popular involve liquid water coming from an aquifer, from melting at the base of old glaciers, or from the melting of ice in the ground when the climate was warmer. Because of the good possibility that liquid water was involved with their formation and that they could be very young, scientists are excited. Maybe the gullies are where we should go to find life.

There is evidence for all three theories. Most of the gully alcove heads occur at the same level, just as one would expect of an aquifer. Various measurements and calculations show that liquid water could exist in aquifers at the usual depths where gullies begin. One variation of this model is that rising hot magma could have melted ice in the ground and caused water to flow in aquifers. Aquifers are layer that allow water to flow. They may consist of porous sandstone. The aquifer layer would be perched on top of another layer that prevents water from going down (in geological terms it would be called impermeable). Because water in an aquifer is prevented from going down, the only direction the trapped water can flow is horizontally. Eventually, water could flow out onto the surface when the aquifer reaches a break—like a crater wall. The resulting flow of water could erode the wall to create gullies. Aquifers are quite common on Earth. A good example is "Weeping Rock" in Zion National Park, Utah.

As for the next theory, much of the surface of Mars is covered by a thick smooth mantle that is thought to be a mixture of ice and dust. This ice-rich mantle, a few yards thick, smooths the land, but in places it has a bumpy texture, resembling the surface of a basketball. The mantle may be like a glacier and under certain conditions the ice that is mixed in the mantle could melt and flow down the slopes and make gullies. Because there are few craters on this mantle, the mantle is relatively young. An excellent view of this mantle is shown below in the picture of the Ptolemaeus Crater Rim, as seen by HiRISE. The ice-rich mantle may be the result of climate changes. Changes in Mars's orbit and tilt cause significant changes in the distribution of water ice from polar regions down to latitudes equivalent to Texas. During certain climate periods water vapor leaves polar ice and enters the atmosphere. The water comes back to ground at lower latitudes as deposits of frost or snow mixed generously with dust. The atmosphere of Mars contains a great deal of fine dust particles. Water vapor will condense on the particles, then fall down to the ground due to the additional weight of the water coating. When Mars is at its greatest tilt or obliquity, up to two centimeters of ice could be removed from the summer ice cap and deposited at midlatitudes. This movement of water could last for several thousand years and create a snow layer of up to around ten meters thick. When ice at the top of the mantling layer goes back into the atmosphere, it leaves behind dust, which insulating the remaining ice. Measurements of altitudes and slopes of gullies support the idea that snowpacks or glaciers are associated with gullies. Steeper slopes have more shade which would preserve snow. Higher elevations have far fewer gullies because ice would tend to sublimate more in the thin air of the higher altitude.

The third theory might be possible since climate changes may be enough to simply allow ice in the ground to melt and thus form the gullies. During a warmer climate, the first few meters of ground could thaw and produce a "debris flow" similar to those on the dry and cold Greenland east coast. Since the gullies occur on steep slopes only a small decrease of the shear strength of the soil particles is needed to begin the flow. Small amounts of liquid water from melted ground ice could be enough. Calculations show that a third of a mm of runoff can be produced each day for 50 days of each Martian year, even under current conditions.

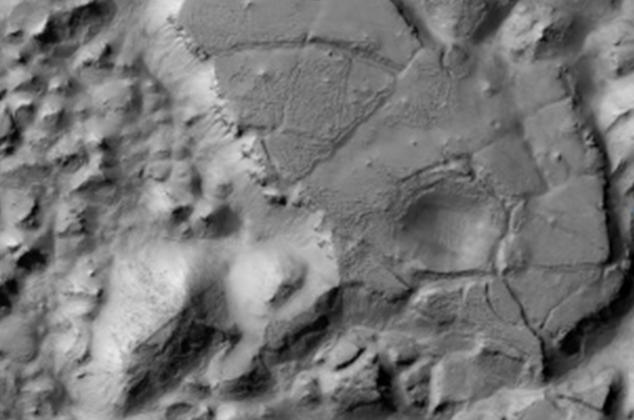
Gorgonum Chaos as seen by Mars Reconnaissance Orbiter HiRISE. Image about 4 km wide.

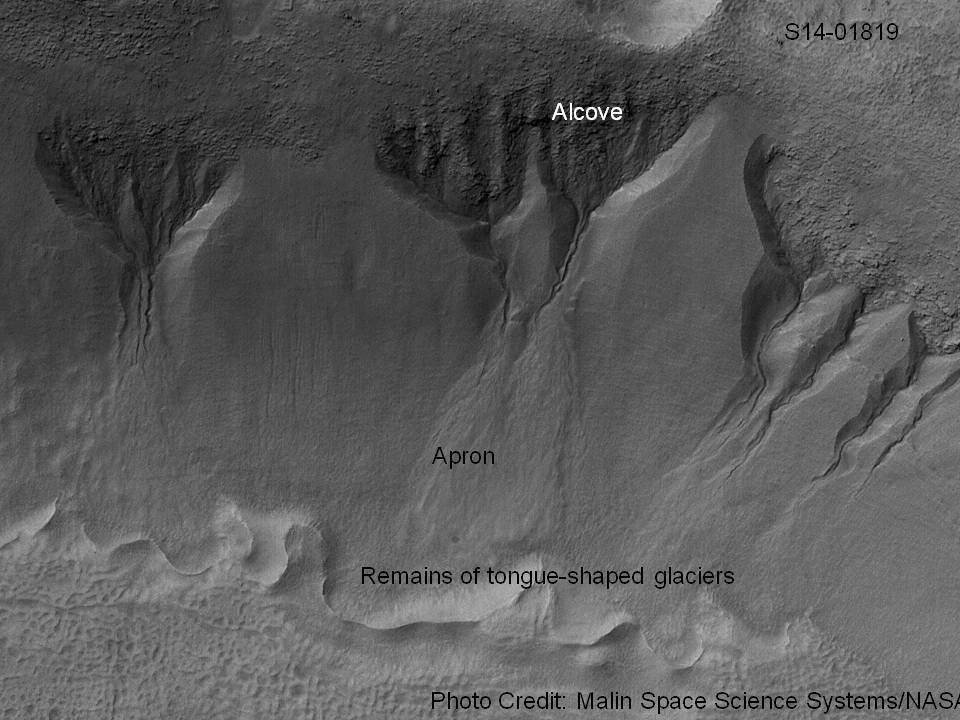
Group of gullies on north wall of crater that lies west of the crater Newton (41.3047 degrees south latitude, 192.89 east longitide). Image taken with Mars Global Surveyor under the MOC Public Targeting Program.

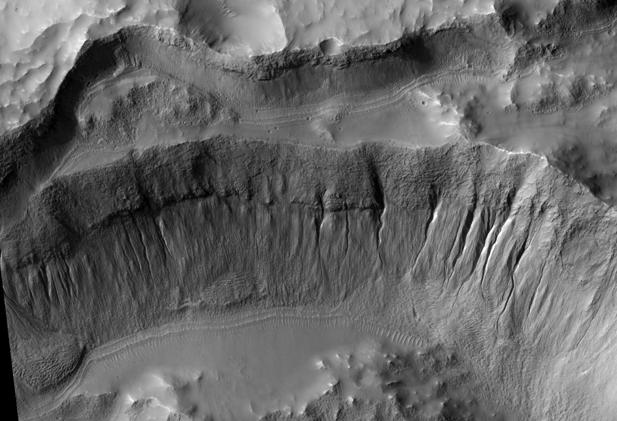
Crater wall inside Mariner Crater showing a large group of gullies, as seen by HiRISE

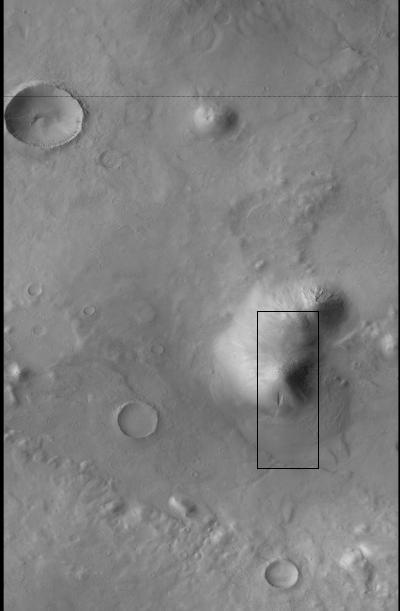
CTX image of the next image showing a wide view of the area. Since the hill is isolated it would be difficult for an aquifer to develop. Rectangle shows the approximate location of the next image.

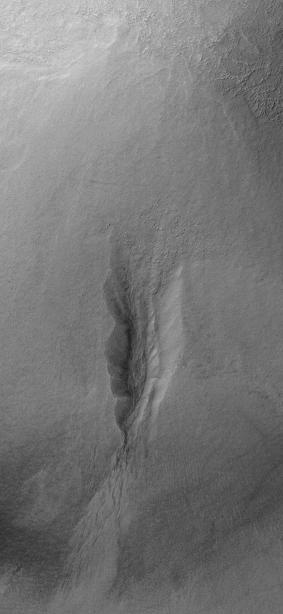
Gully on mound as seen by Mars Global Surveyor, under the MOC Public Targeting Program. Images of gullies on isolated peaks, like this one, are difficult to explain with the theory of water coming from aquifers because aquifers need large collecting areas.

== Associated features of gullies ==
Sometimes other features appear near gullies. At the base of some gullies there may be depressions or curved ridges. These have been called "spatulate depressions." These depressions form after glacial ice disappears. Steep walls often develop glaciers during certain climates. When the climate changes, the ice in the glaciers sublimates in the thin Martian atmosphere. Sublimation is when a substance goes directly from a solid state to a gas state. Dry ice on Earth does this. So when the ice at the base of a steep wall sublimates, a depression results. Also, more ice from higher up will tend to flow downward. This flow will stretch the surface rocky debris thereby forming transverse crevasses. Such formations have been termed "washboard terrain" because they resemble the old fashioned washboards. The parts of gullies and some associated features of gullies are shown below in a HiRISE images.

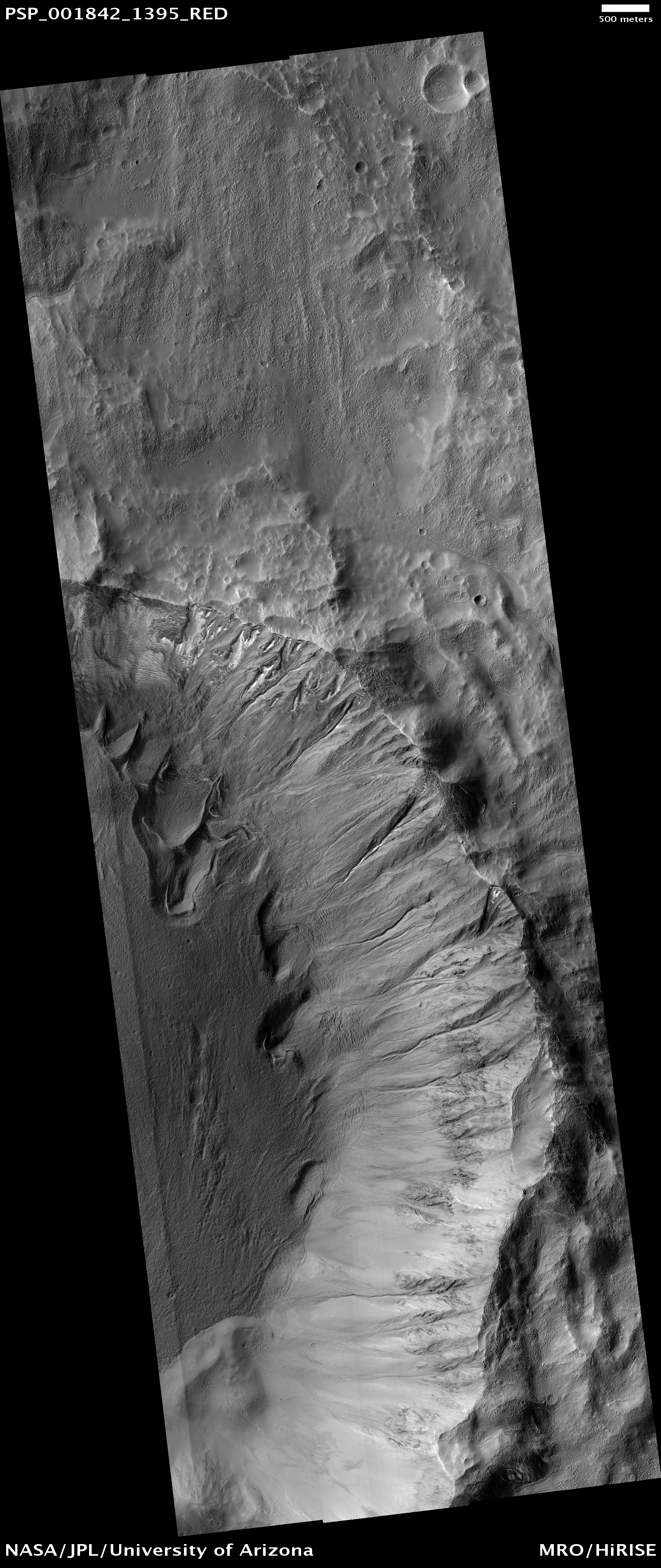
Wide view of crater showing gullies and other features, as seen by HiRISE

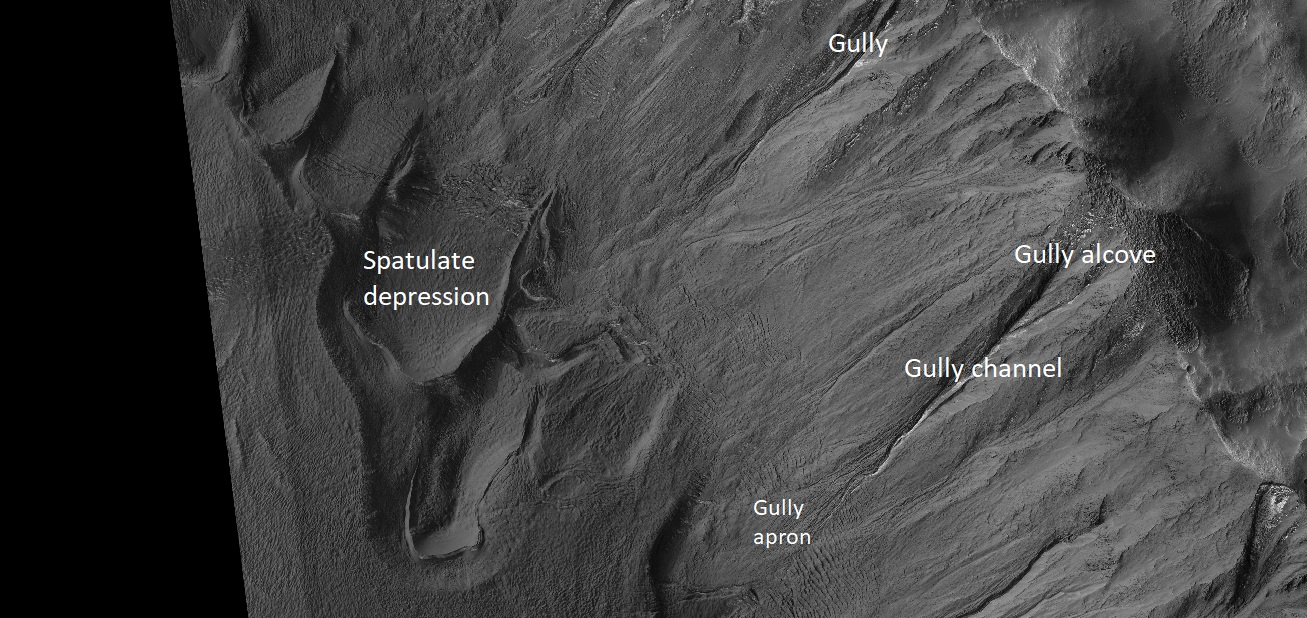
Close view of crater labeled with "spatulate depression" and other features, as seen by HiRISE. Note: this is an enlargement of the previous image.

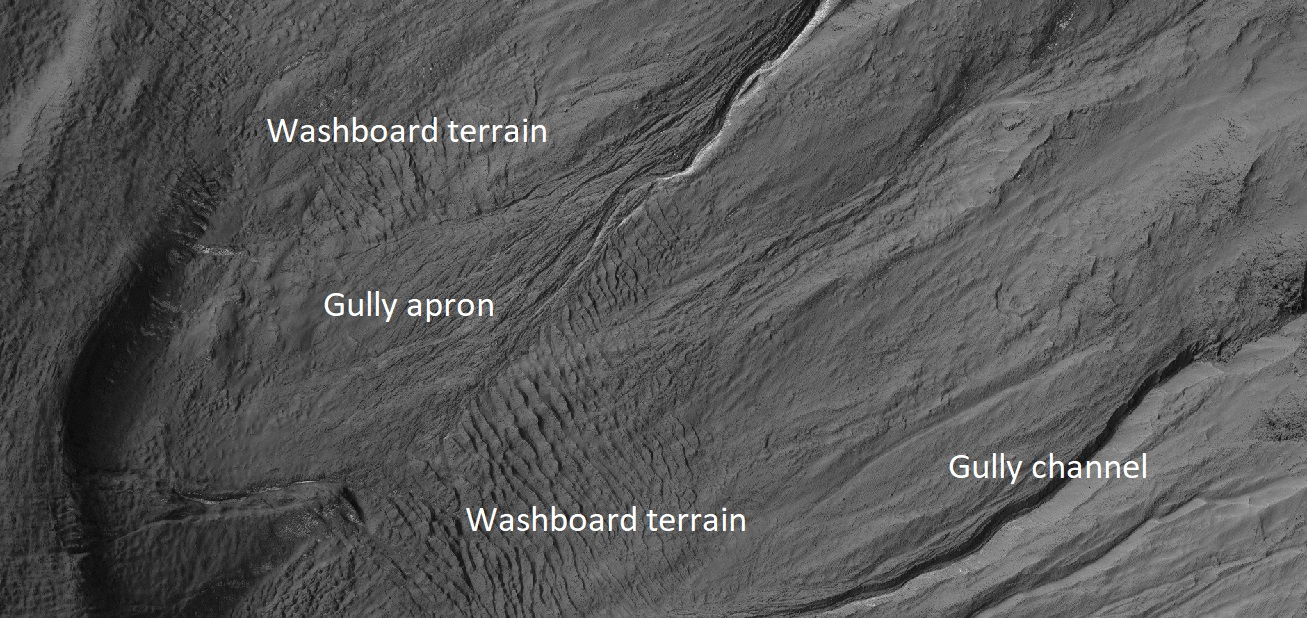
Close view of crater labeled with "washboard terrain" and other features, as seen by HiRISE. Note: this is an enlargement of a previous image. The washboard terrain was formed before the gully apron since the gully apron cuts across the washboard terrain.

== Tongue-shaped glaciers ==
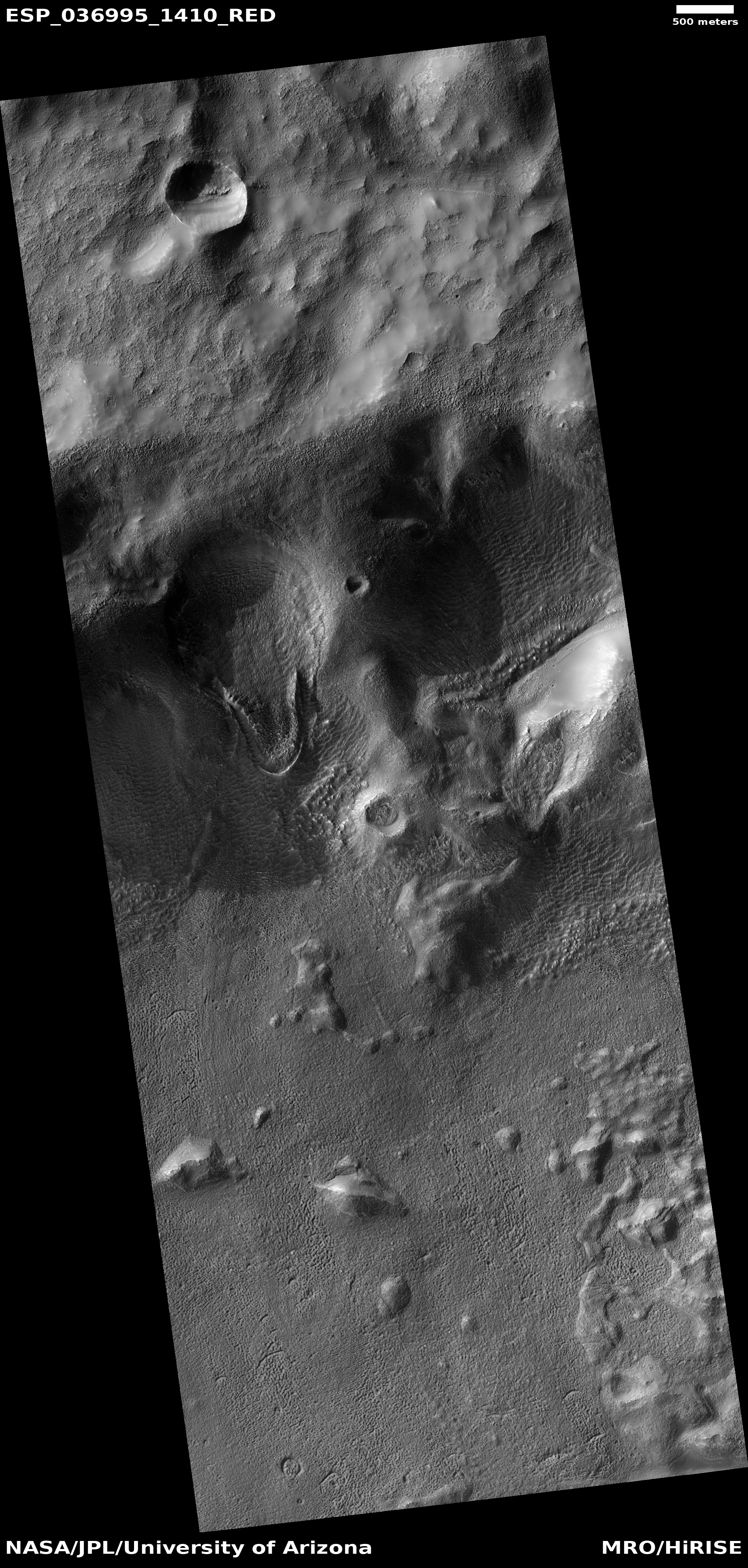
Tongue-shaped glacier, as seen by HiRISE under the HiWish program. Location is Phaethontis quadrangle.

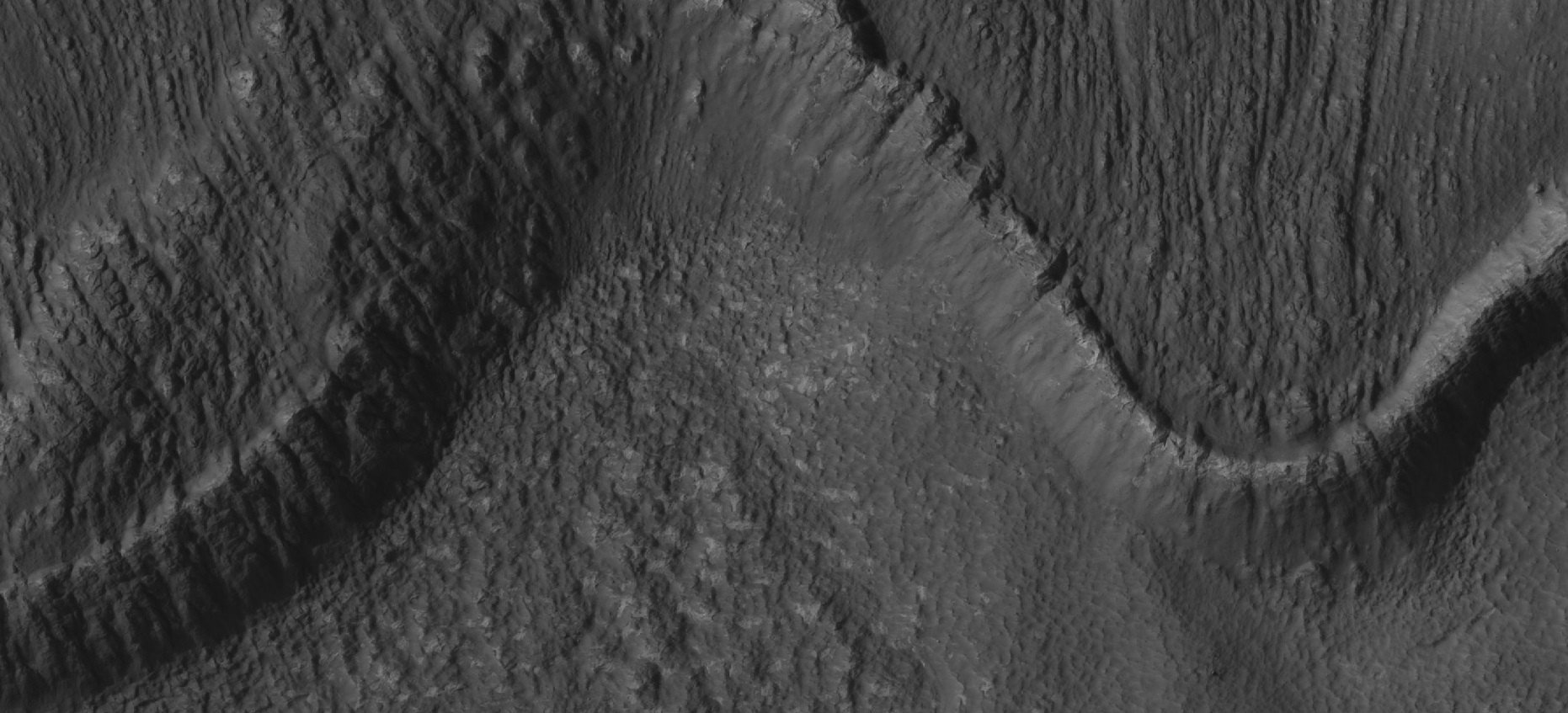
Close-up of the snouts of two glaciers from the previous image, as seen by HiRISE under the HiWish program. These are towards the bottom left of the previous image.

== Possible pingos ==
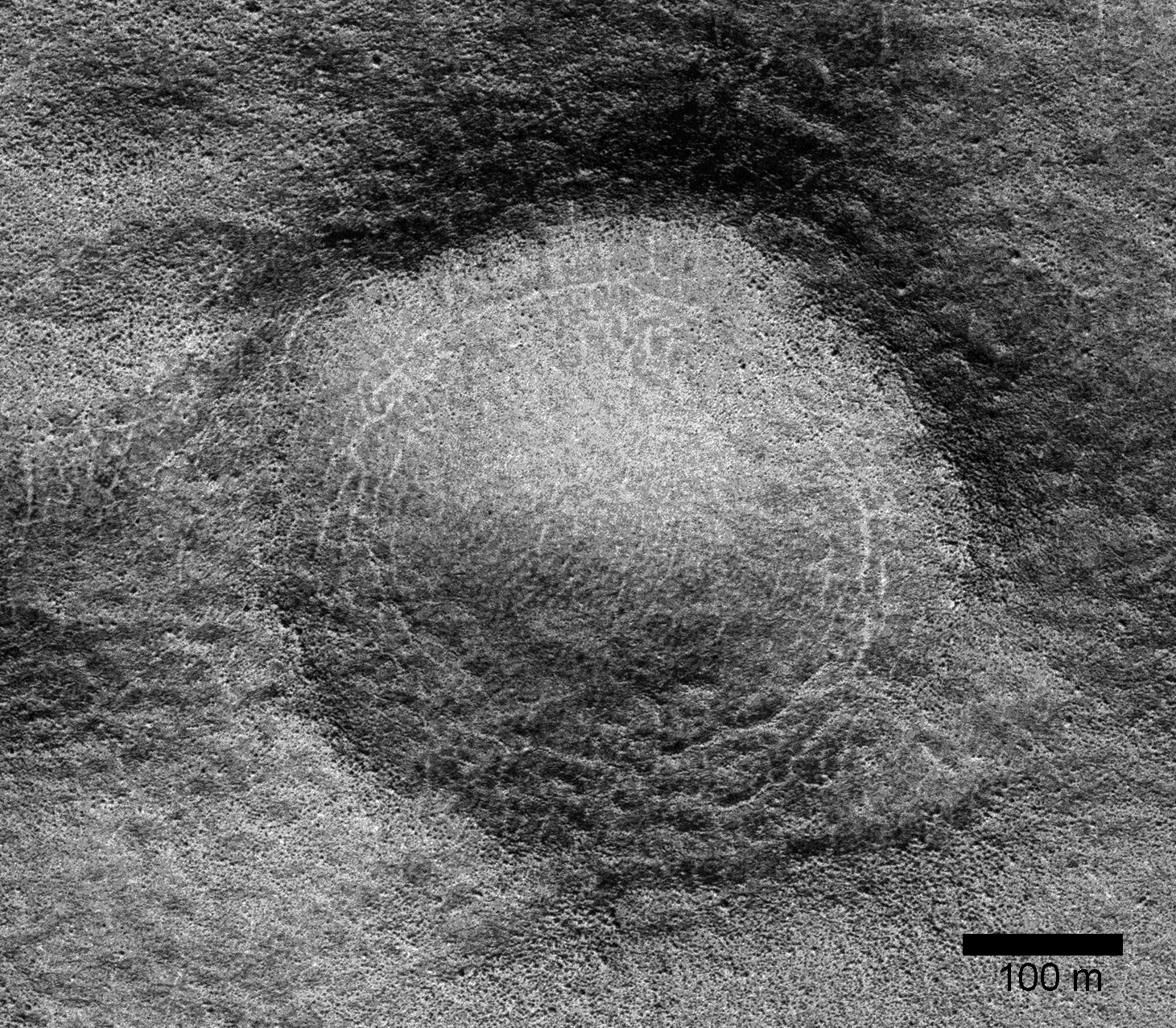
Close view of possible pingo with scale, as seen by HiRISE under HiWish program

The radial and concentric cracks visible here are common when forces penetrate a brittle layer, such as a rock thrown through a glass window. These particular fractures were probably created by something emerging from below the brittle Martian surface. Ice may have accumulated under the surface in a lens shape; thus making these cracked mounds. Ice being less dense than rock, pushed upwards on the surface and generated these spider web-like patterns. A similar process creates similar sized mounds in arctic tundra on Earth. Such features are called "pingos", an Inuit word. Pingos would contain pure water ice; thus they could be sources of water for future colonists of Mars.

== Concentric crater fill ==
Concentric crater fill, like lobate debris aprons and lineated valley fill, is believed to be ice-rich. Based on accurate topography measures of height at different points in these craters and calculations of how deep the craters should be based on their diameters, it is thought that the craters are 80% filled with mostly ice. That is, they hold hundreds of meters of material that probably consists of ice with a few tens of meters of surface debris. The ice accumulated in the crater from snowfall in previous climates. Recent modeling suggests that concentric crater fill develops over many cycles in which snow is deposited, then moves into the crater. Once inside the crater shade and dust preserve the snow. The snow changes to ice. The many concentric lines are created by the many cycles of snow accumulation. Generally snow accumulates whenever the axial tilt reaches 35 degrees.

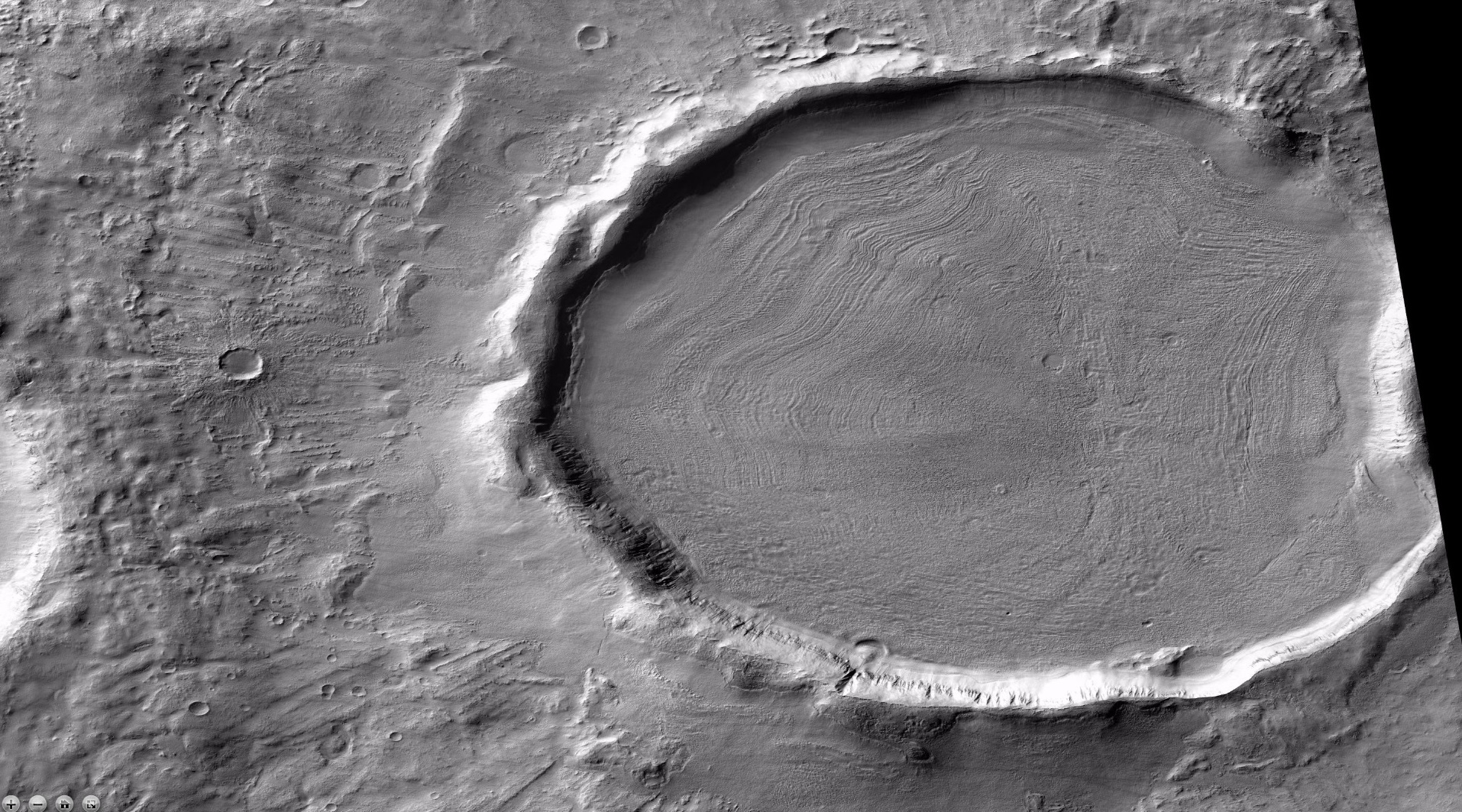
Crater showing concentric crater fill, as seen by CTX (on Mars Reconnaissance Orbiter). Location is Phaethontis quadrangle.

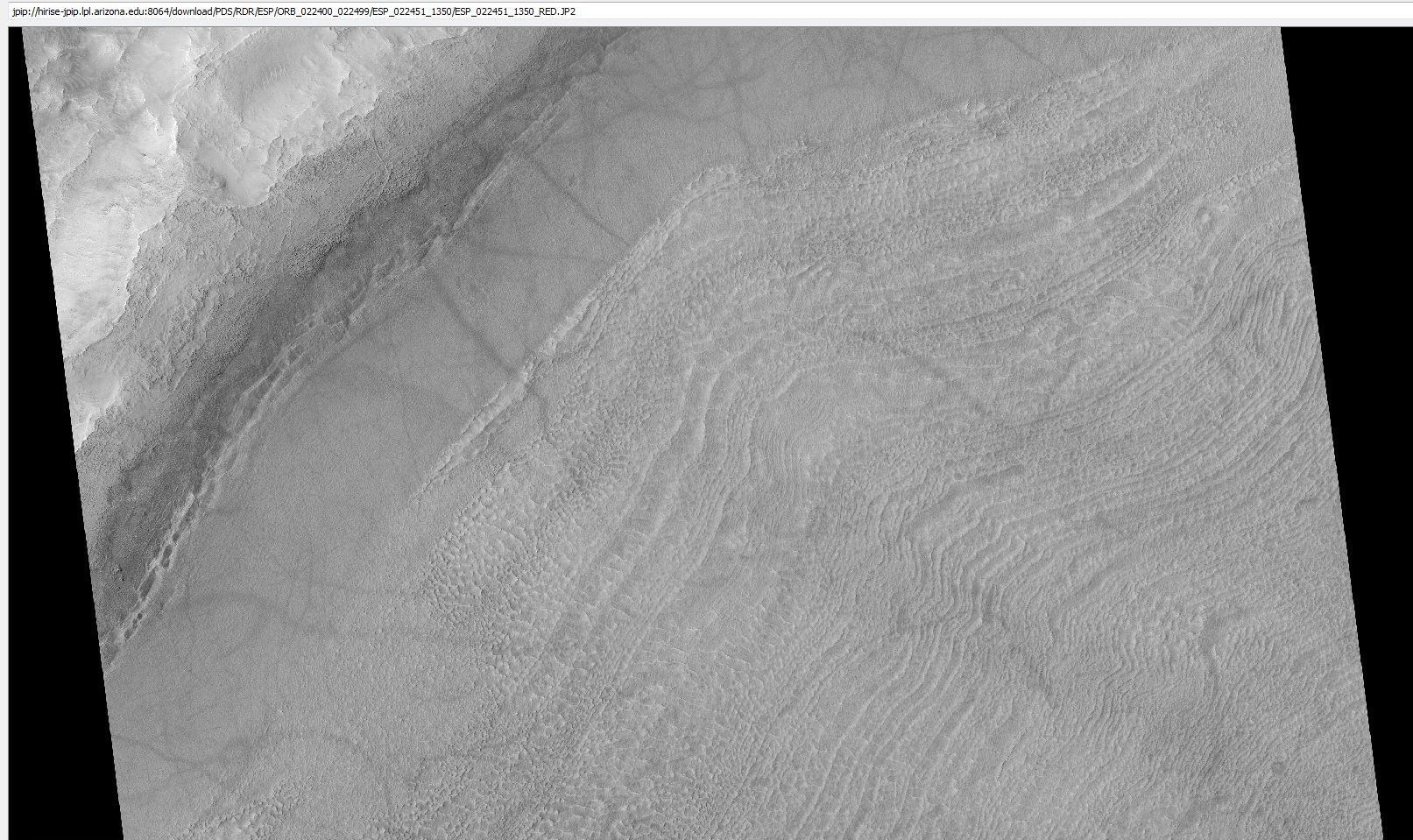
Close-up view of concentric crater fill, as seen by HiRISE under HiWish program. Note: this is an enlargement of previous image of a concentric crater. Location is Phaethontis quadrangle.
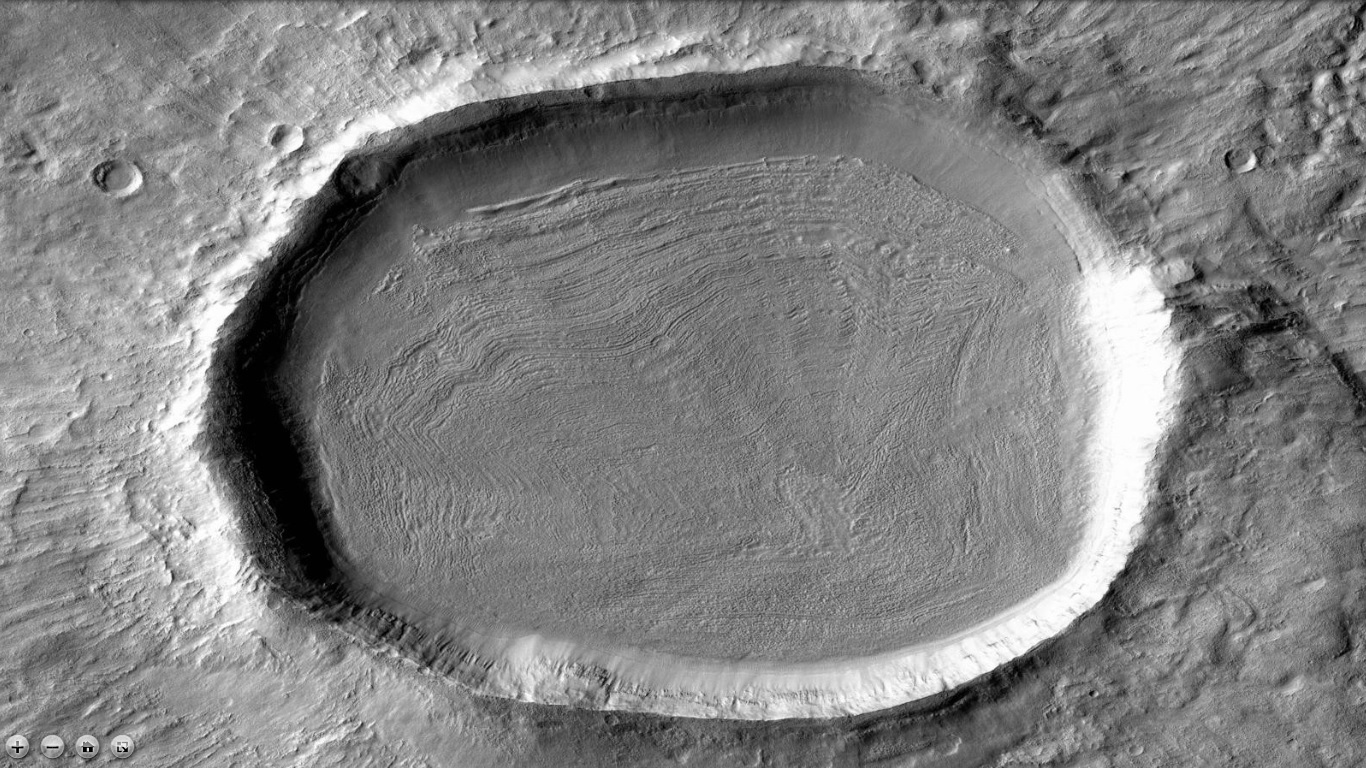
Concentric crater fill, as seen by HiRISE under HiWish program

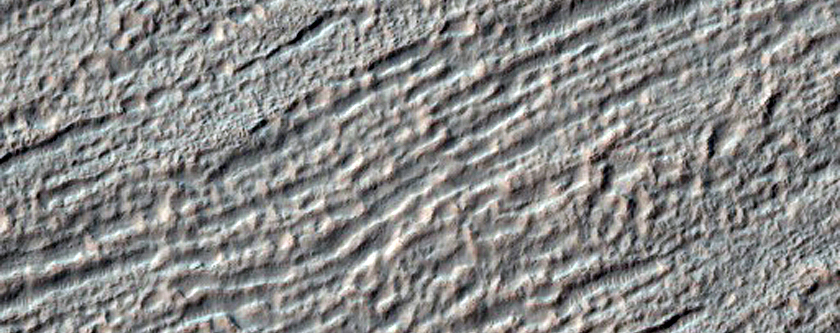
Close, color view of concentric crater fill, as seen by HiRISE under HiWish program

== Magnetic stripes and plate tectonics ==
Global map of magnetic anomalies Large craters and volcanoes are in dark green. Solid line represents the dichotomy boundary.

The Mars Global Surveyor (MGS) discovered magnetic stripes in the crust of Mars, especially in the Phaethontis and Eridania quadrangles (Terra Cimmeria and Terra Sirenum). The magnetometer on MGS discovered 100 km wide stripes of magnetized crust running roughly parallel for up to 2000 km. These stripes alternate in polarity with the north magnetic pole of one pointing up from the surface and the north magnetic pole of the next pointing down. When similar stripes were discovered on Earth in the 1960s, they were taken as evidence of plate tectonics. Researchers believe these magnetic stripes on Mars are evidence for a short, early period of plate tectonic activity. When the rocks became solid they retained the magnetism that existed at the time. A magnetic field of a planet is believed to be caused by fluid motions under the surface. However, there are some differences, between the magnetic stripes on Earth and those on Mars. The Martian stripes are wider, much more strongly magnetized, and do not appear to spread out from a middle crustal spreading zone. Because the area containing the magnetic stripes is about 4 billion years old, it is believed that the global magnetic field probably lasted for only the first few hundred million years of Mars' life, when the temperature of the molten iron in the planet's core might have been high enough to mix it into a magnetic dynamo. There are no magnetic fields near large impact basins like Hellas. The shock of the impact may have erased the remnant magnetization in the rock. Magnetism produced by early fluid motion in the core would not have existed after the impacts.

When molten rock containing magnetic material, such as hematite (Fe_{2}O_{3}), cools and solidifies in the presence of a magnetic field, it becomes magnetized and takes on the polarity of the background field. This magnetism is lost only if the rock is subsequently heated above a particular temperature (the Curie point which is 770 °C for iron). The magnetism left in rocks is a record of the magnetic field when the rock solidified.

== Chloride deposits ==
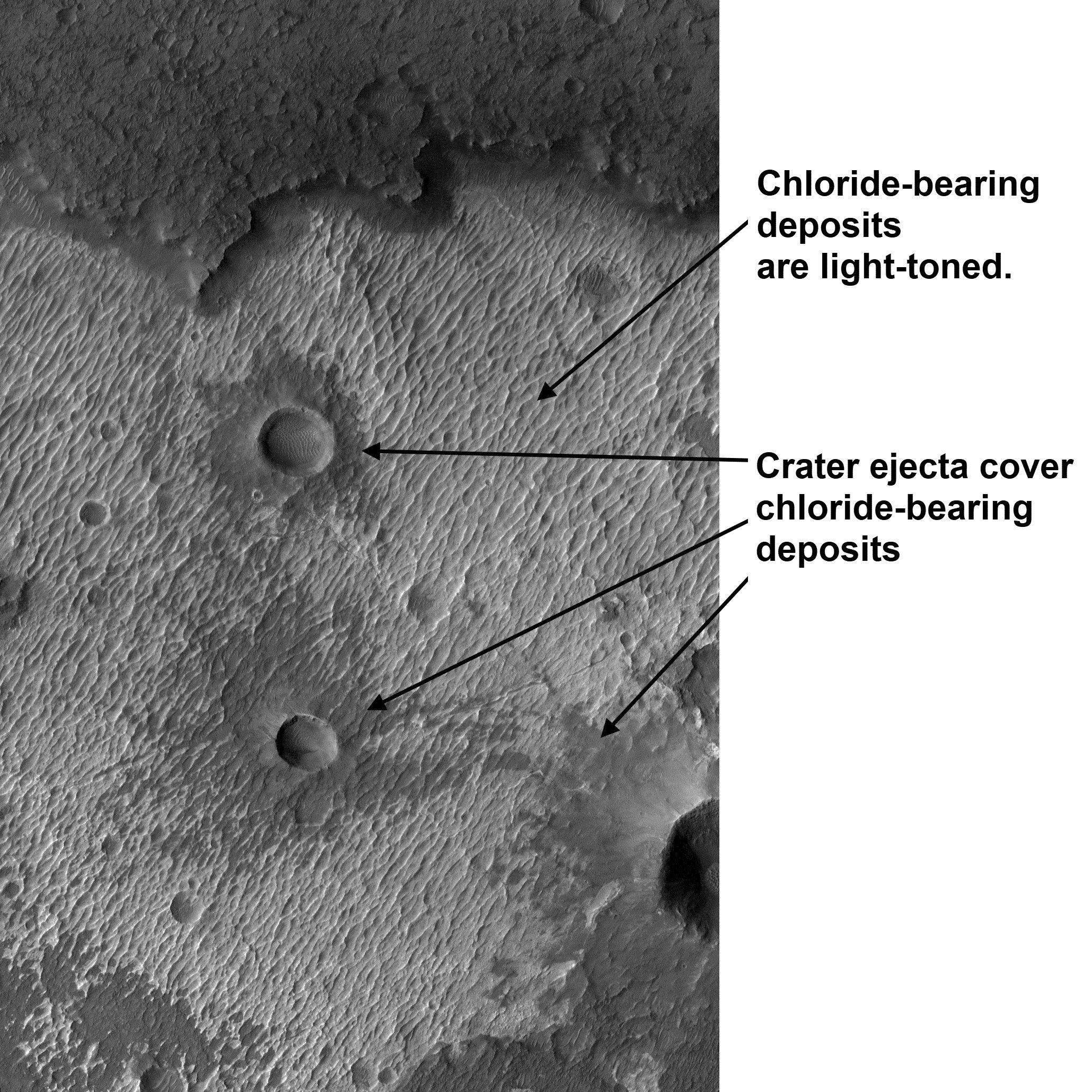
Evidence of water from chloride deposits in Phaethontis. Picture from HiRISE.

Using data from Mars Global Surveyor, Mars Odyssey and the Mars Reconnaissance Orbiter, scientists have found widespread deposits of chloride minerals. A picture below shows some deposits within the Phaethontis quadrangle. Evidence suggests that the deposits were formed from the evaporation of mineral enriched waters. The research suggests that lakes may have been scattered over large areas of the Martian surface. Usually chlorides are the last minerals to come out of solution. Carbonates, sulfates, and silica should precipitate out ahead of them. Sulfates and silica have been found by the Mars rovers on the surface. Places with chloride minerals may have once held various life forms. Furthermore, such areas should preserve traces of ancient life.

Based on chloride deposits and hydrated phyllosilicates, Alfonso Davila and others believe there is an ancient lakebed in Terra Sirenum that had an area of 30,000 km^{2} (12,000 sq mi) and was 200 metres (660 ft) deep. Other evidence that supports this lake are normal and inverted channels like ones found in the Atacama Desert.

== Fossae ==
The Elysium quadrangle is home to large troughs (long narrow depressions) called fossae in the geographical language used for Mars. Troughs are created when the crust is stretched until it breaks. The stretching can be due to the large weight of a nearby volcano. Fossae/pit craters are common near volcanoes in the Tharsis and Elysium system of volcanoes.

Icaria Fossae Graben, as seen by HiRISE. Click on image for a better view of Dust Devil Tracks.

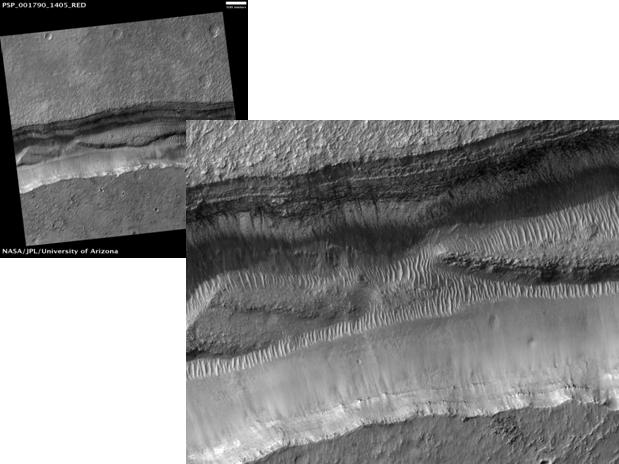
Sirenum Fossae Layers, as seen by HiRISE. Scale bar is 500 meters long.

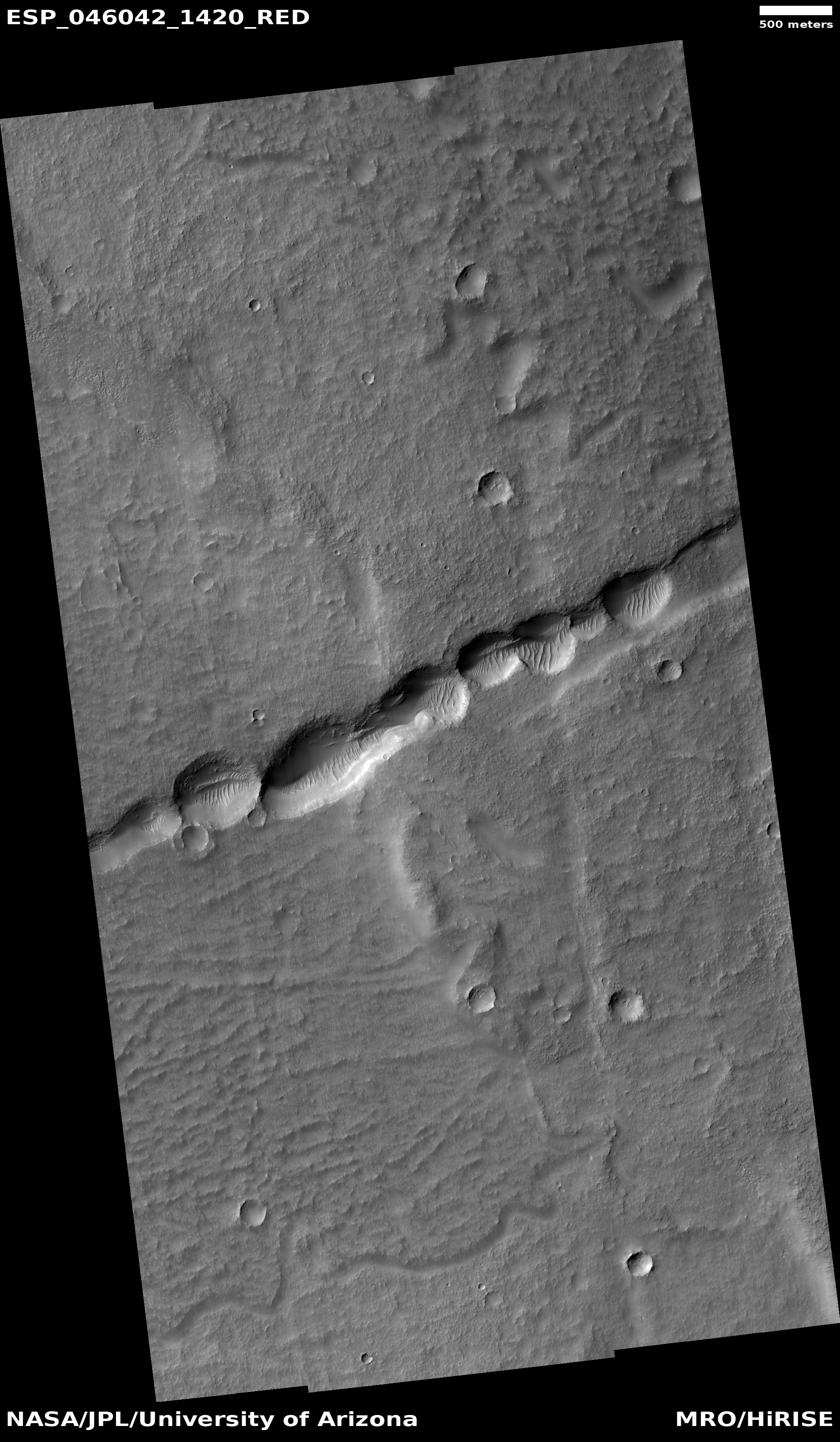
Pits in troughs, as seen by HiRISE under HiWish program

== Strange surfaces ==
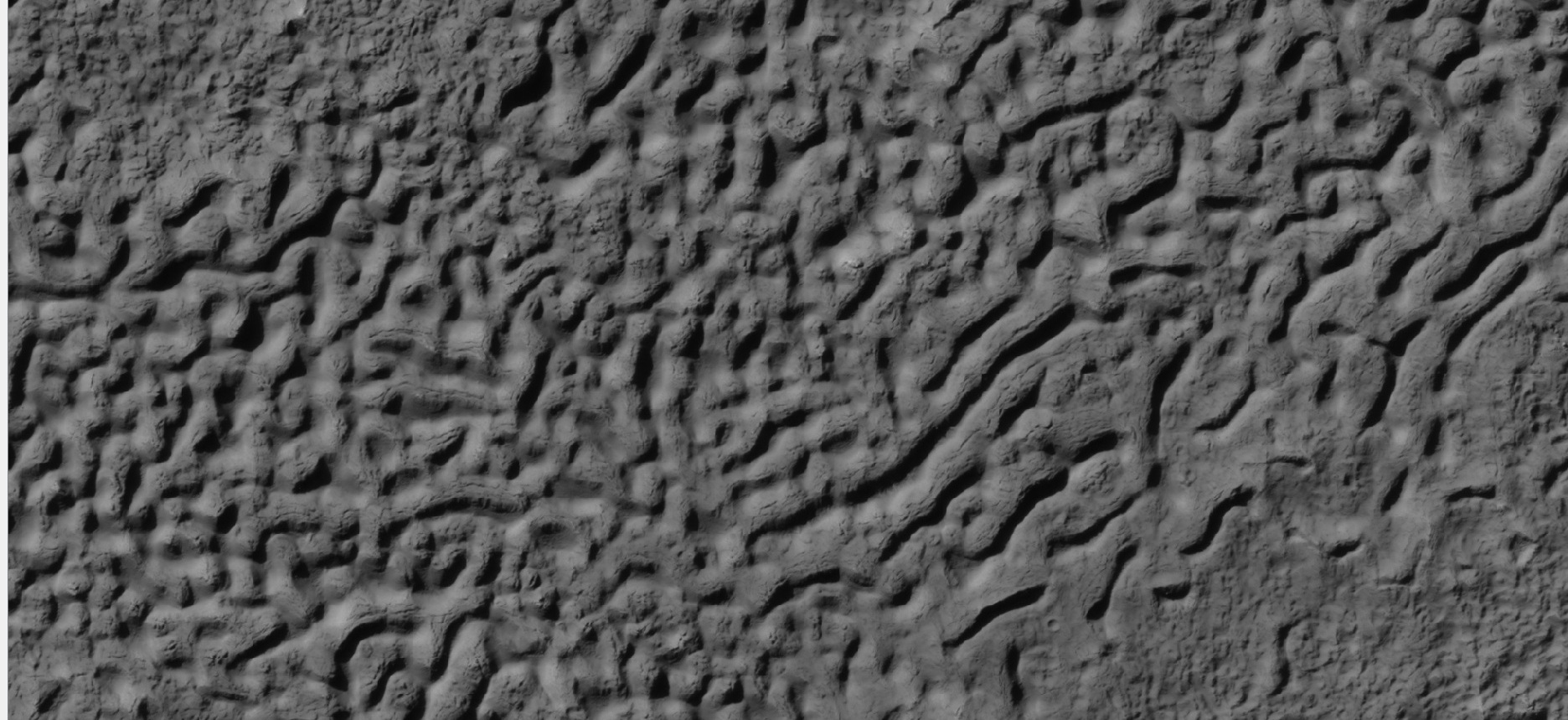
Surface of crater floor showing details from image taken with HiRISE, under HiWish program. This may be a transition from one type of structure to a different, maybe due to erosion.

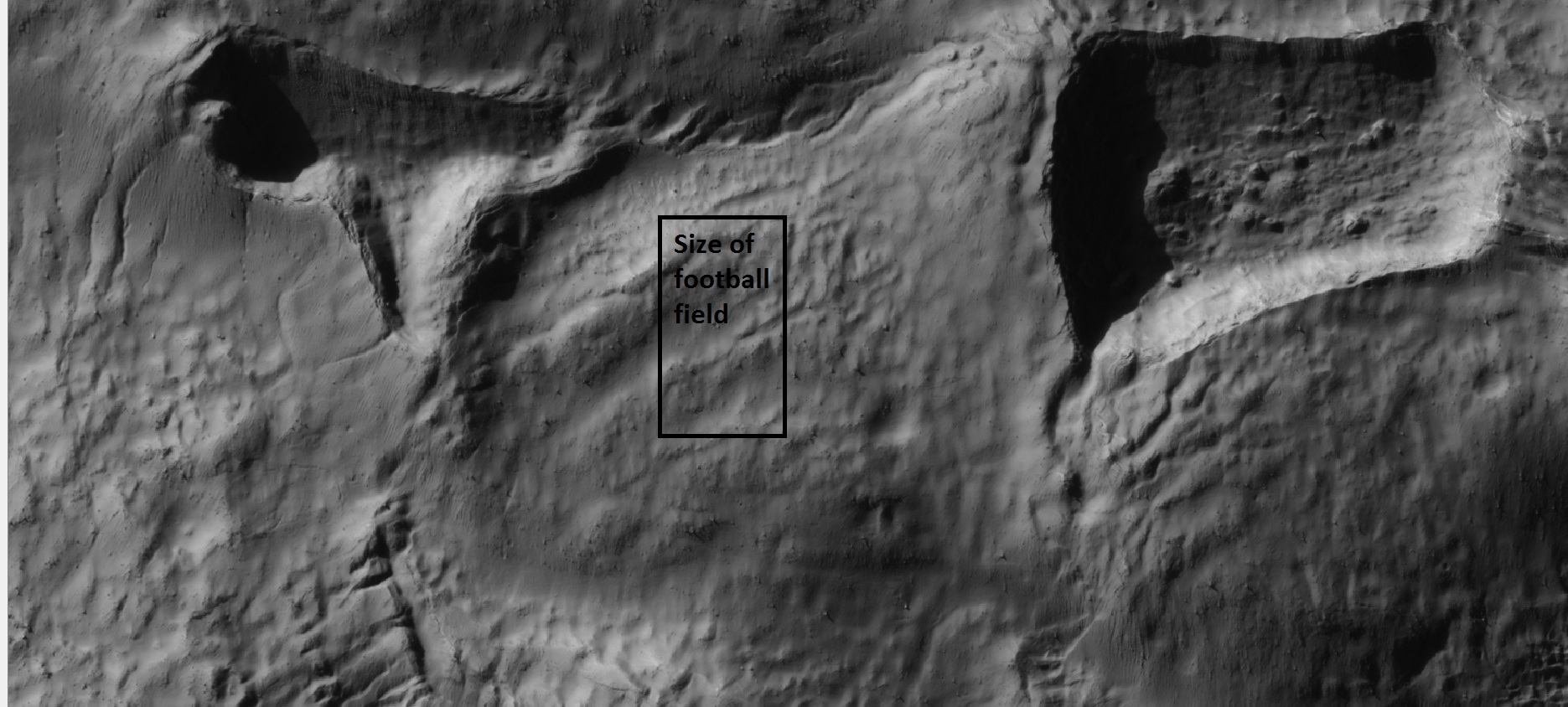
Close-up of surface with large hollows, as seen by HiRISE under HiWish program

== Craters ==
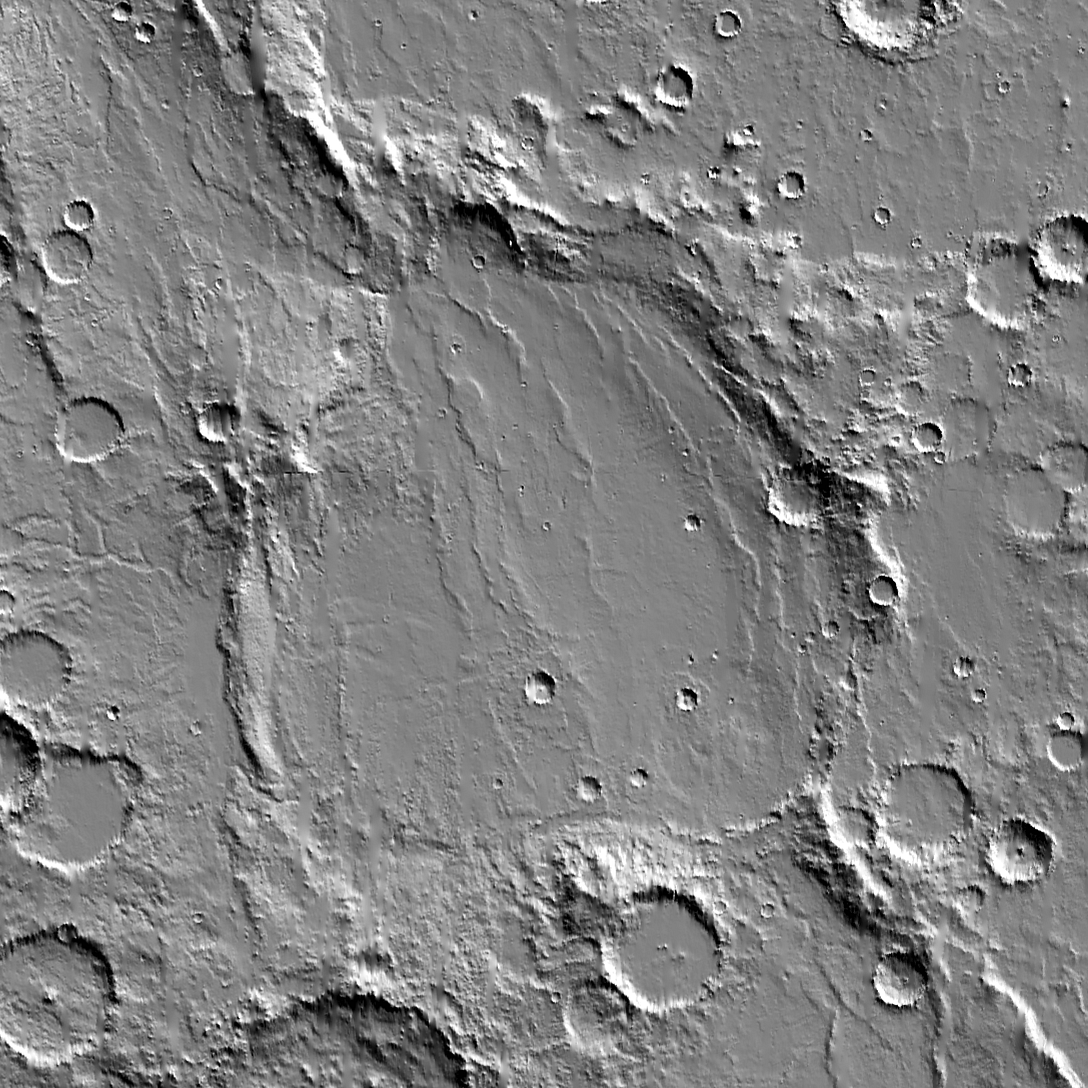
Copernicus crater

The density of impact craters is used to determine the surface ages of Mars and other solar system bodies. The older the surface, the more craters present. Crater shapes can reveal the presence of ground ice.

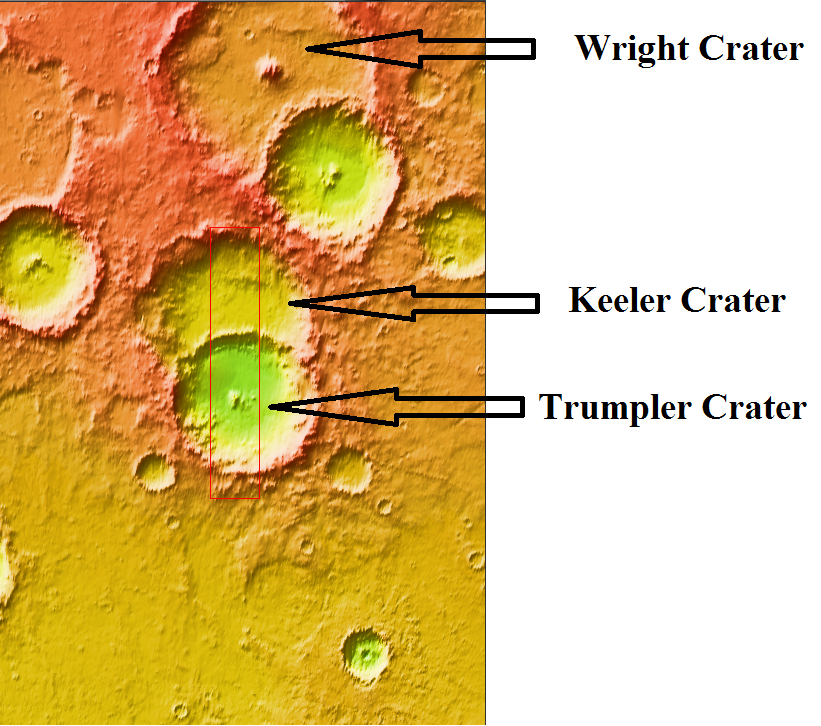
MOLA image showing the relationship among Wright, Keeler, and Trumpler Craters. Colors indicate elevations.

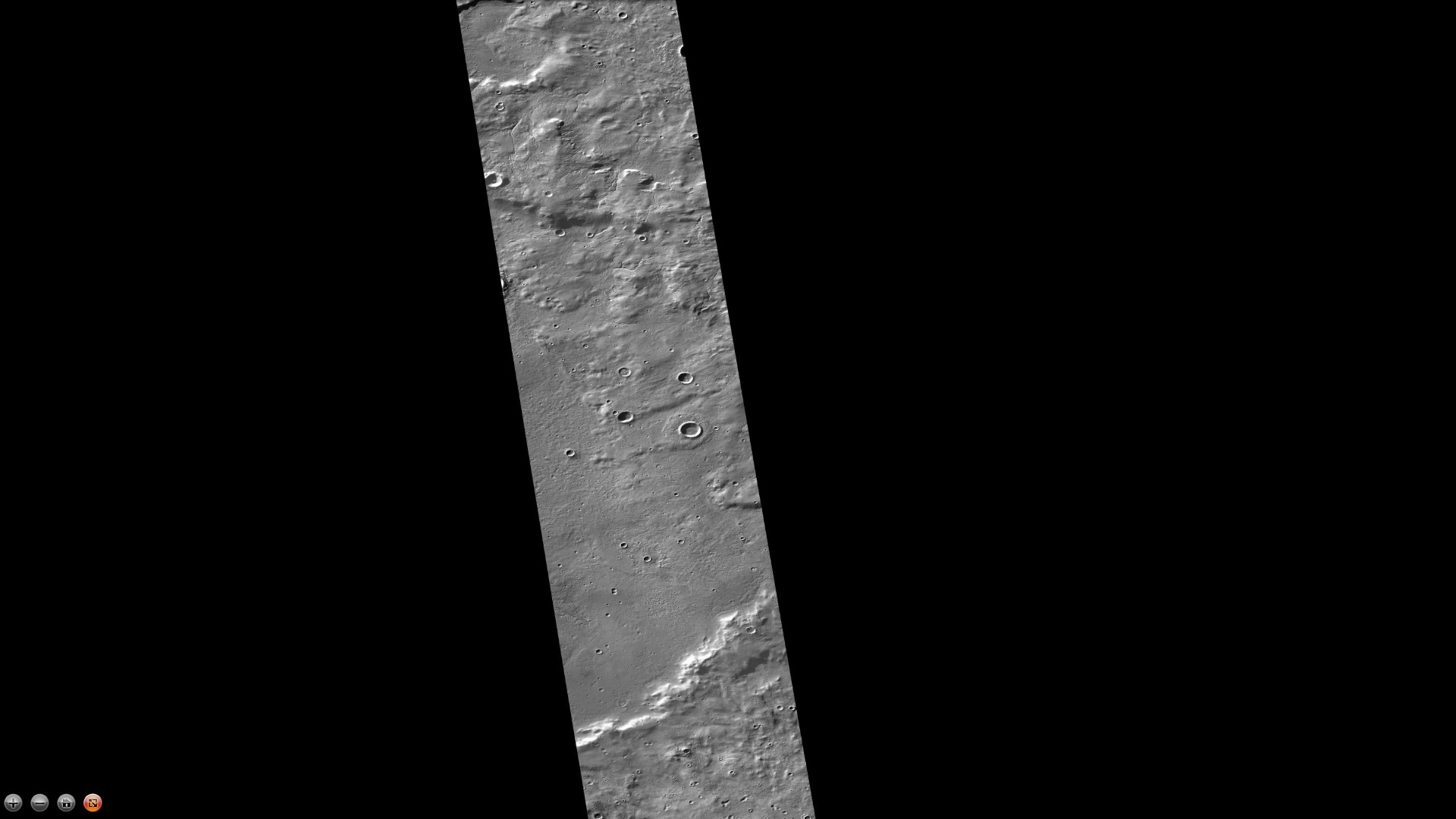
East side of Hipparchus Crater, as seen by CTX camera (on Mars Reconnaissance Orbiter)

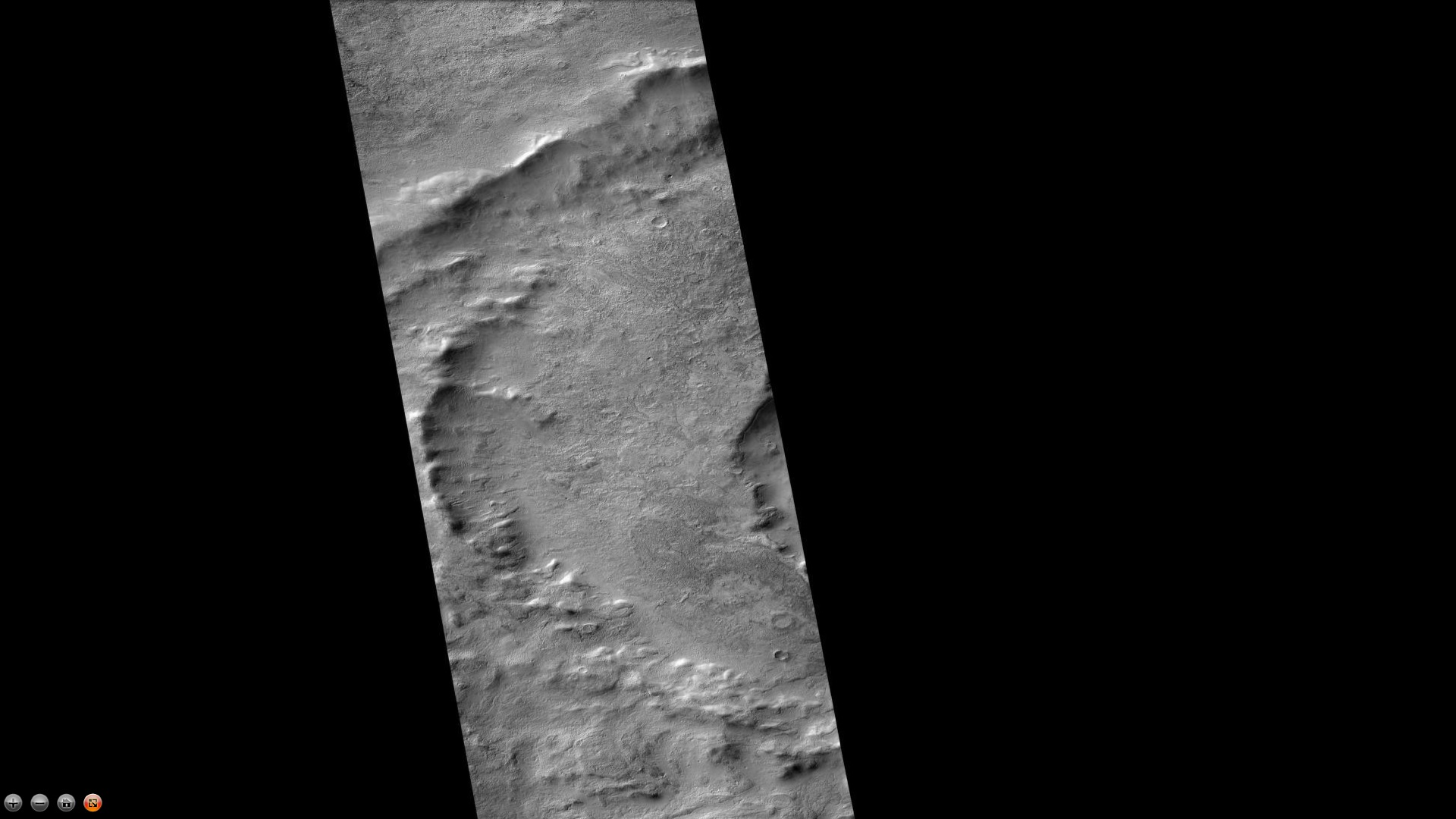
West side of Nansen Crater, as seen by CTX camera (on Mars Reconnaissance Orbiter)

The area around craters may be rich in minerals. On Mars, heat from the impact melts ice in the ground. Water from the melting ice dissolves minerals, and then deposits them in cracks or faults that were produced with the impact. This process, called hydrothermal alteration, is a major way in which ore deposits are produced. The area around Martian craters may be rich in useful ores for the future colonization of Mars. Studies on Earth have documented that cracks are produced and that secondary minerals veins are deposited in the cracks. Images from satellites orbiting Mars have detected cracks near impact craters. Great amounts of heat are produced during impacts. The area around a large impact may take hundreds of thousands of years to cool. Many craters once contained lakes. Because some crater floors show deltas, we know that water had to be present for some time. Dozens of deltas have been spotted on Mars. Deltas form when sediment is washed in from a stream entering a quiet body of water. It takes a bit of time to form a delta, so the presence of a delta is exciting; it means water was there for a time, maybe for many years. Primitive organisms may have developed in such lakes; hence, some craters may be prime targets for the search for evidence of life on the Red Planet.

=== List of craters ===
The following is a list of craters in the quadrangle. The crater's central location is of the quadrangle, craters that its central location is in another quadrangle is listed by eastern, western, northern or southern part.

Name	Location	Diameter	Year of approval
Avire	40.82°S 159.76°W	6.85 km	2008
Belyov			
Bunnik			
Clark			
Copernicus	48.8°S 168.8°W	300 km	1973
Cross^{1}		Southern part	
Dechu	42.25°S 157.99°W	22 km	2018
Dokuchaev			
Dunkassa			
Eudoxus	44.9°S 147.5°W	98 km	1973
Galap			
Henbury			
Hussey			
Kamnik			
Keeler	61°S 151.3°W	95 km	1973
Koval'sky^{1}	Southern part	297 km^{1}	1973
Kuiper	57.4°S 157.3°W	87 km	1973
Langtang			
Li Fan	47.2°S 153.2°W	104.8 km	1973
Liu Hsin	53.6°S 171.6°W	137 km	1973
Magelhaens	32.36°S 194.68°W	105 km	
Mariner	35.1°S 164.5°W	170 km	1967
Millman			
Nansen	50.3°S 140.6°W	81 km	1967
Naruko			
Newton	40.8°S 158.1°W	298 km	1973
Niquero			
Nordenskiöld			
Palikir	41.57°S 158.86°W	15.57 km	2011
Pickering			1973
Ptolemaeus	48.21°S 157.6°W	165 km	1973
Reutov			
Selevac			
Sitrah			
Taltal			
Triolet			
Trumpler			
Tyutaram			2013
Very	49.6°S 177.1°W	114.8 km	1973
Wright	58.9°S 151°W	113.7 km	1973
Yaren			

^{1}Partly located in the quadrangle while another part is in a different quadrangle along with the crater's diameter

== Linear ridge networks ==
Linear ridge networks are found in various places on Mars in and around craters. Ridges often appear as mostly straight segments that intersect in a lattice-like manner. They are hundreds of meters long, tens of meters high, and several meters wide. It is thought that impacts created fractures in the surface, these fractures later acted as channels for fluids. Fluids cemented the structures. With the passage of time, surrounding material was eroded away, thereby leaving hard ridges behind. Since the ridges occur in locations with clay, these formations could serve as a marker for clay which requires water for its formation. Water here could have supported past life in these locations. Clay may also preserve fossils or other traces of past life.

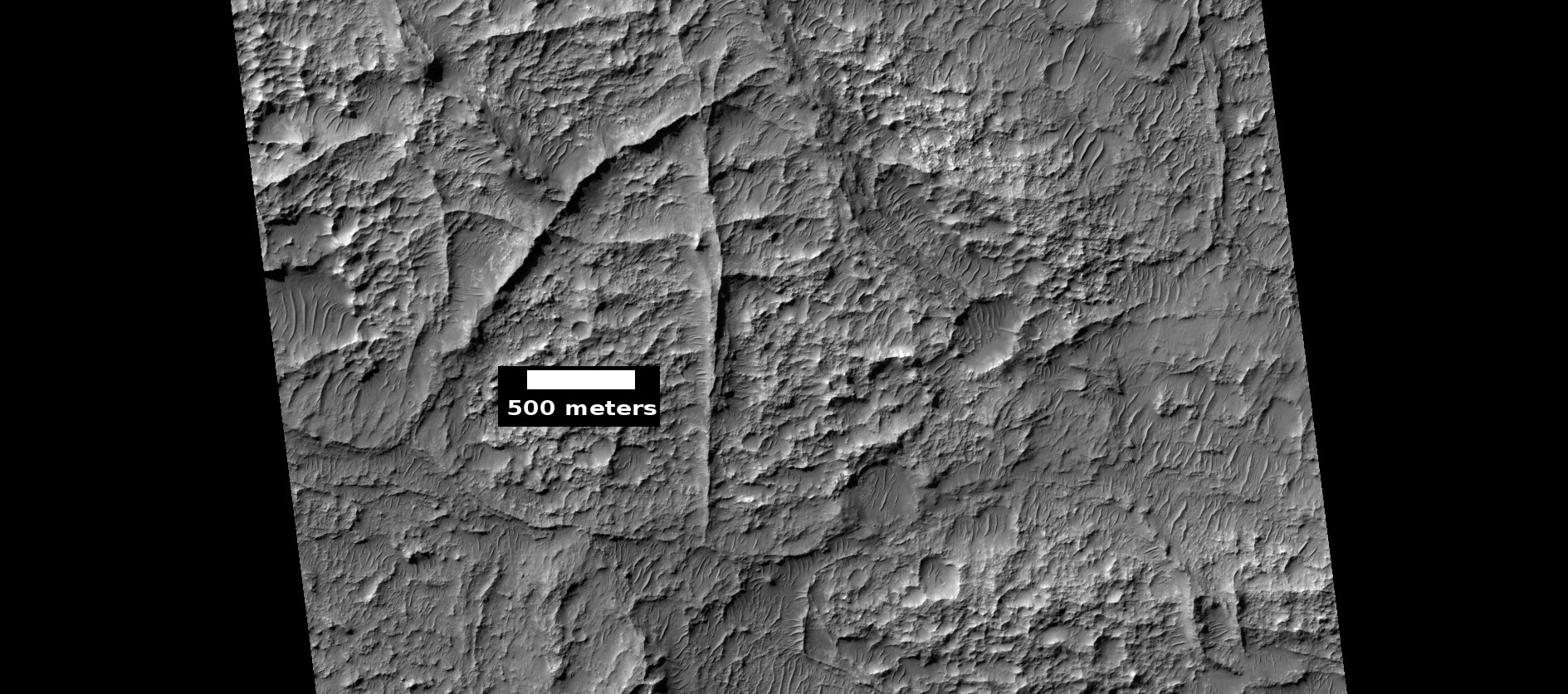
Linear ridge networks, as seen by HiRISE under HiWish program

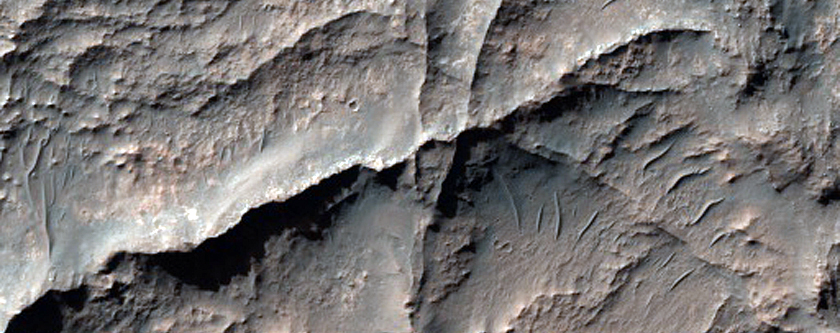
Close-up of linear ridge networks from the previous image, as seen by HiRISE under HiWish program

== Dunes ==
Sand dunes have been found in many places on Mars. The presence of dunes shows that the planet has an atmosphere with wind, for dunes require wind to pile up the sand. Most dunes on Mars are black because of the weathering of the volcanic rock basalt. Black sand can be found on Earth on Hawaii and on some tropical South Pacific islands. Sand is common on Mars due to the old age of the surface that has allowed rocks to erode into sand. Dunes on Mars have been observed to move many meters. Some dunes move along. In this process, sand moves up the windward side and then falls down the leeward side of the dune, thus caused the dune to go toward the leeward side (or slip face). When images are enlarged, some dunes on Mars display ripples on their surfaces. These are caused by sand grains rolling and bouncing up the windward surface of a dune. The bouncing grains tend to land on the windward side of each ripple. The grains do not bounce very high so it does not take much to stop them.

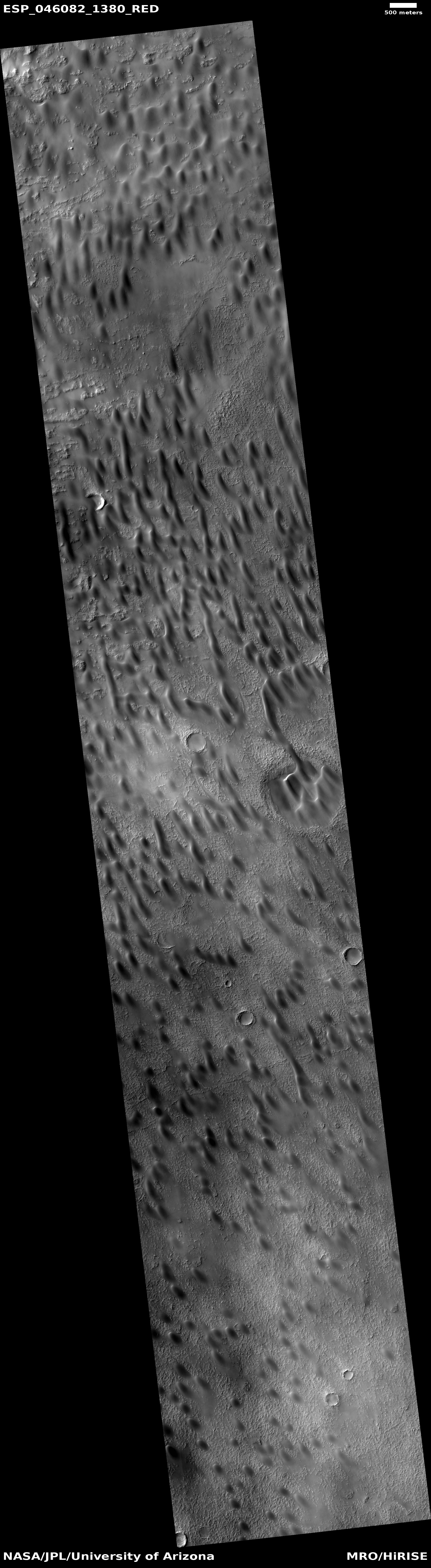
Dunes in Newton (Martian crater), as seen by HiRISE under HiWish program

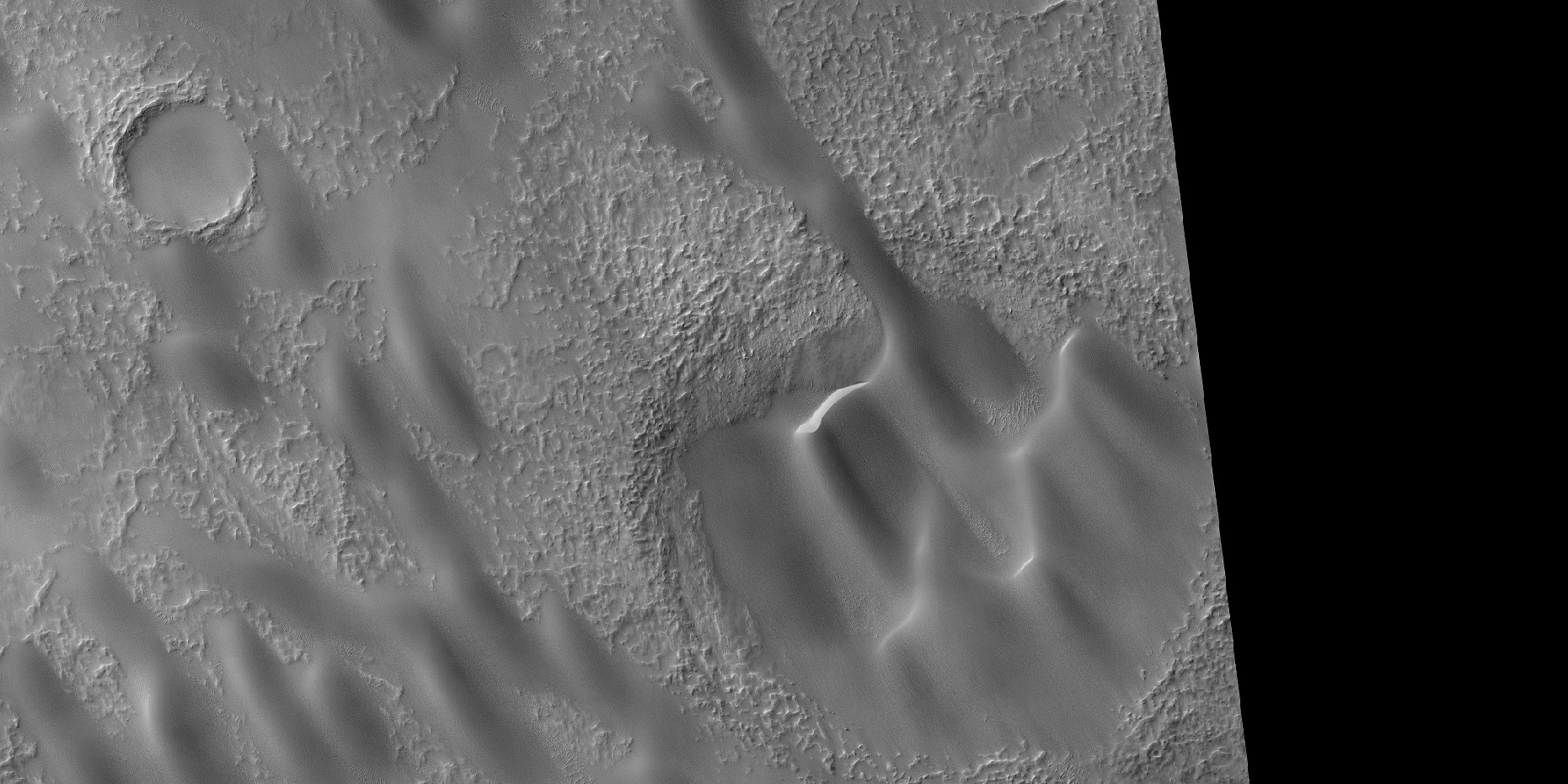
Close view of dunes in Newton Crater showing ripples on surface, as seen by HiRISE under HiWish program

== Mantle ==
Much of the Martian surface is covered with a thick ice-rich, mantle layer that has fallen from the sky a number of times in the past. In some places a number of layers are visible in the mantle.

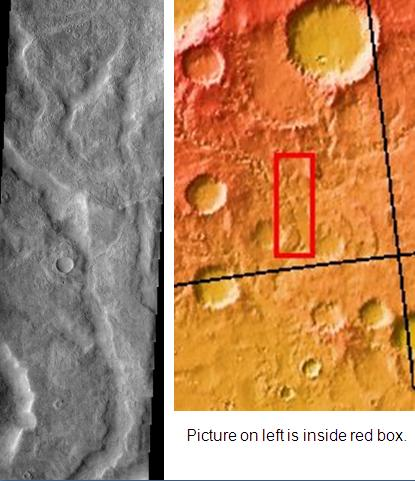
Tader Valles, as seen by THEMIS. Smooth material in channels may be a mantle in the form of dirty snow.

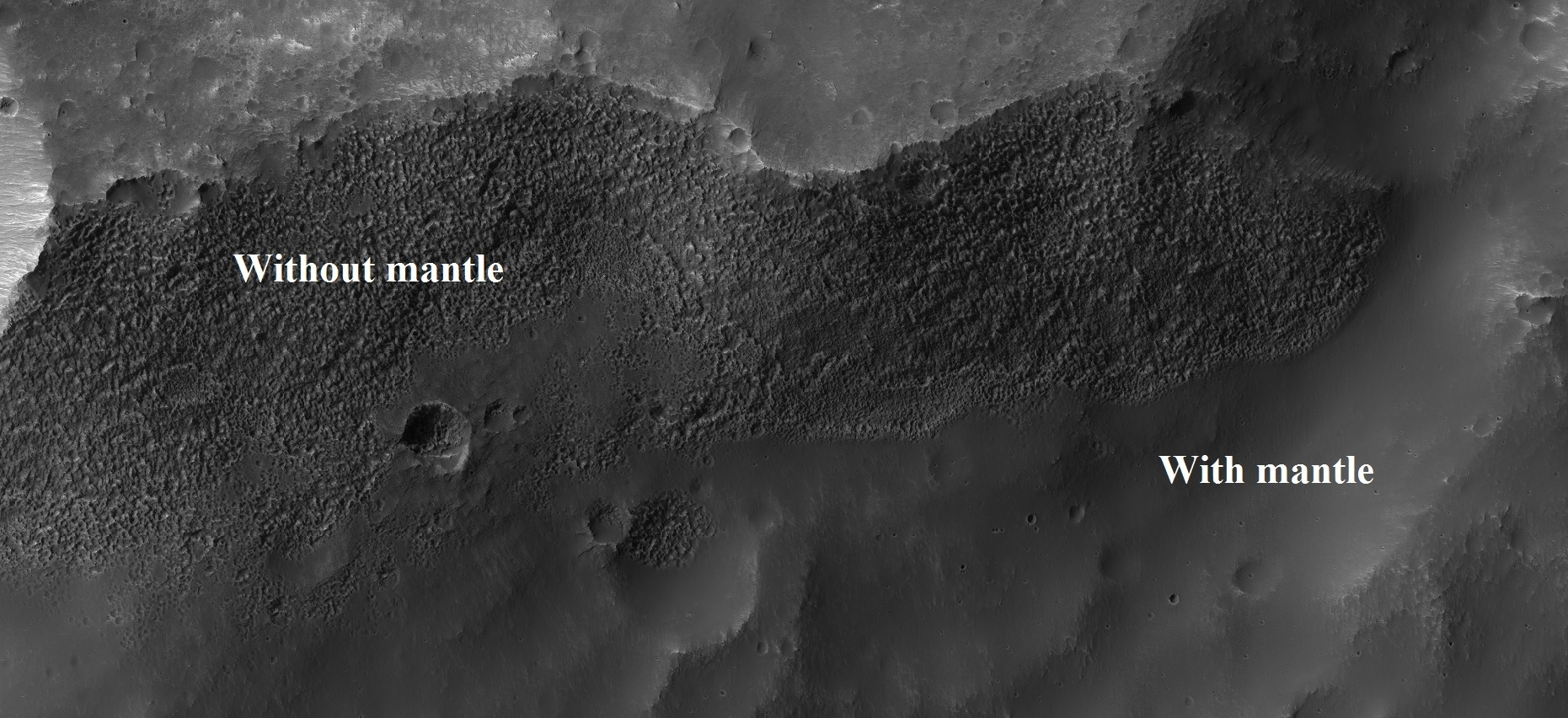
Surface showing appearance with and without mantle covering, as seen by HiRISE, under the HiWish program. Location is Terra Sirenum in Phaethontis quadrangle.

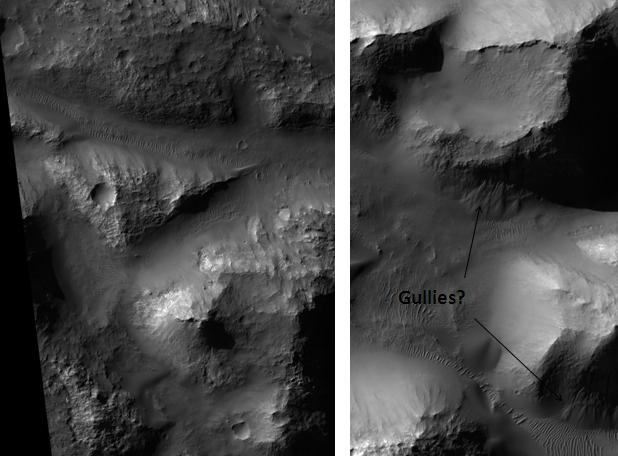
Atlantis Chaos, within the Atlantis basin, as seen by HiRISE. Click on image to see mantle covering and possible gullies. The two images are different parts of the original image. They have different scales.

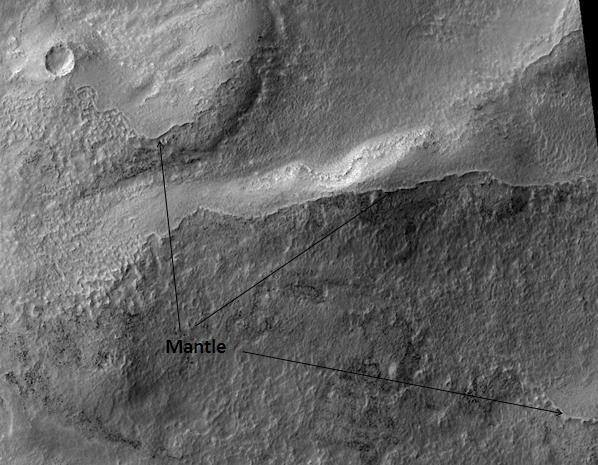
Ptolemaeus Crater Rim, as seen by HiRISE. Click on image to see excellent view of mantle deposit.

== Channels ==
There is evidence that water once flowed in river valleys on Mars. Images of curved channels have been seen in images from Mars spacecraft dating back to the early 1970s with the Mariner 9 orbiter. A study published in June 2017 calculated that the volume of water needed to carve all the channels on Mars was even larger than the proposed ocean that the planet may have had. Water was probably recycled many times from the ocean to rainfall around Mars.

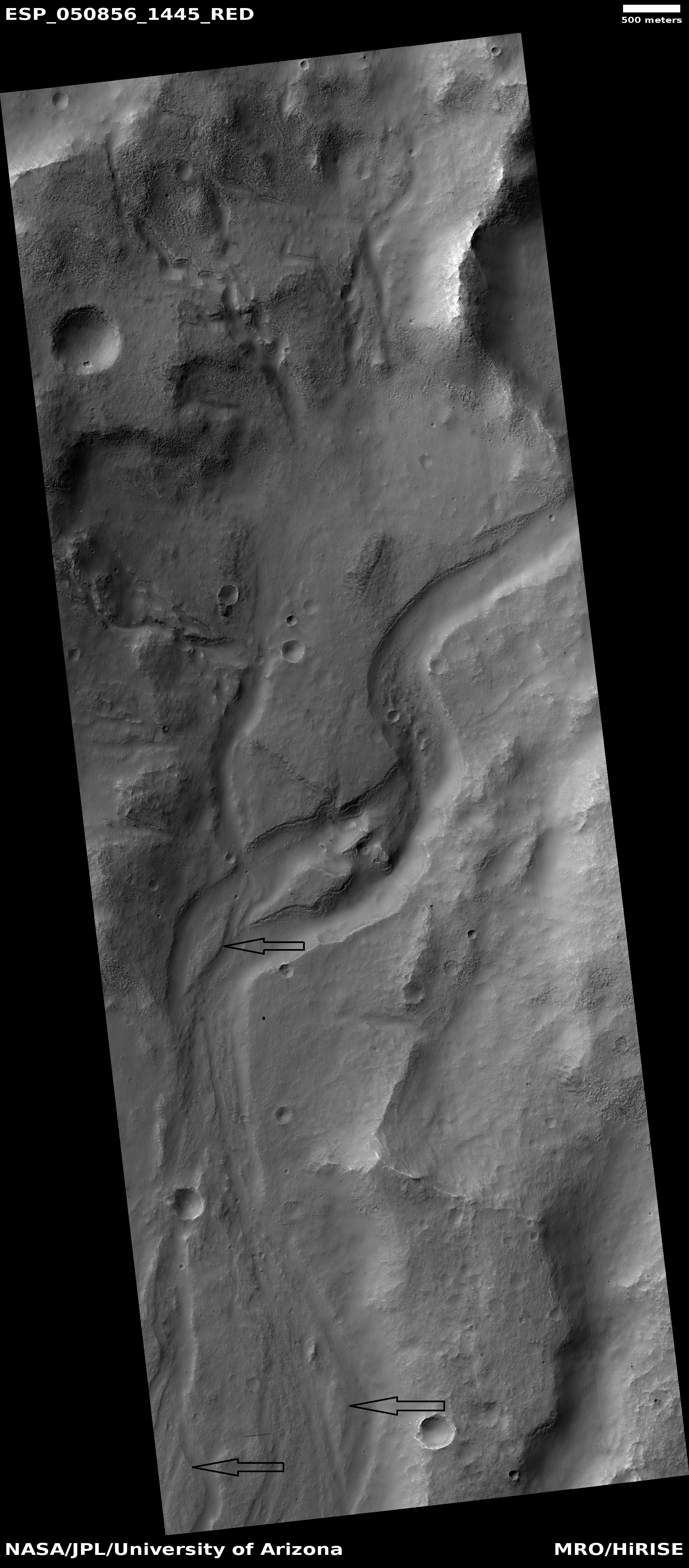
Channel, as seen by HiRISE under HiWish program. Streamlined shapes are indicated with arrows.

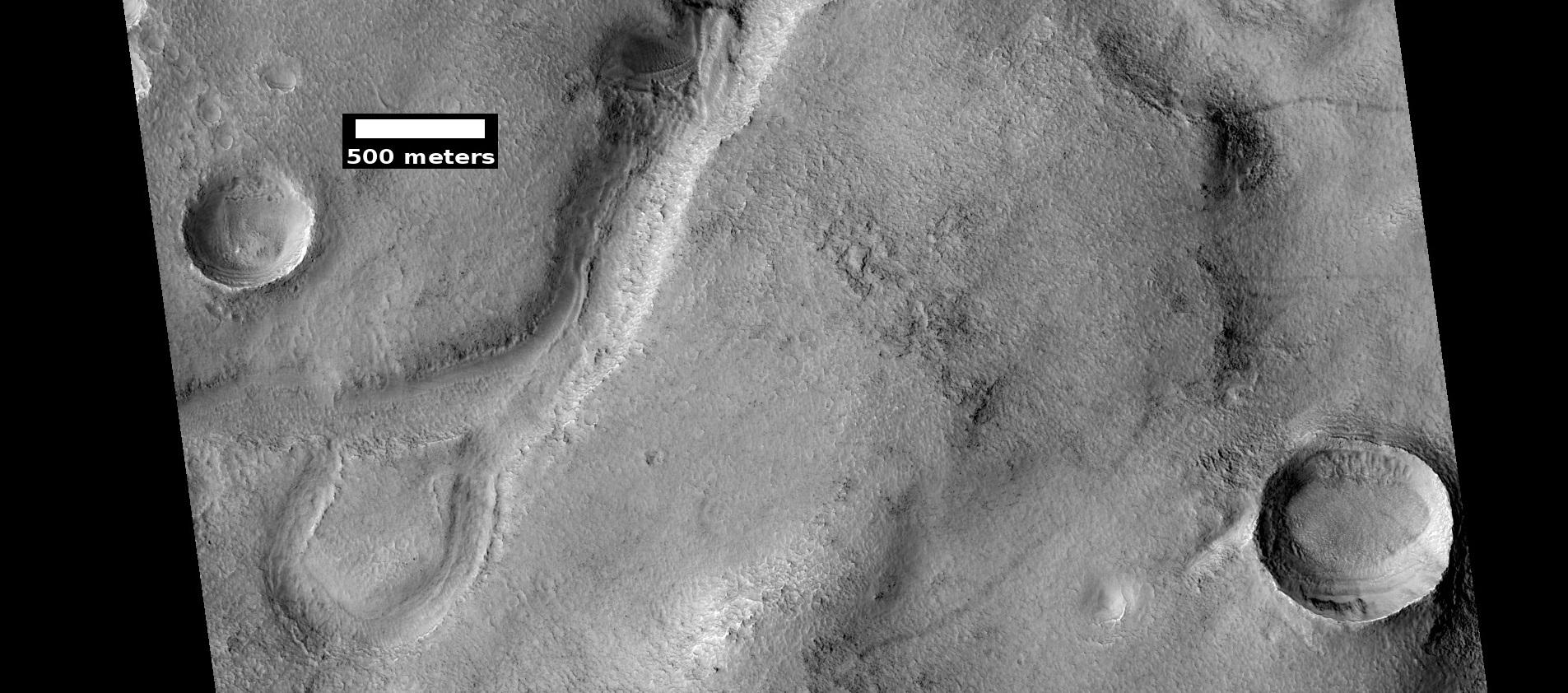
Oxbow lake, as seen by HiRISE under HiWish program

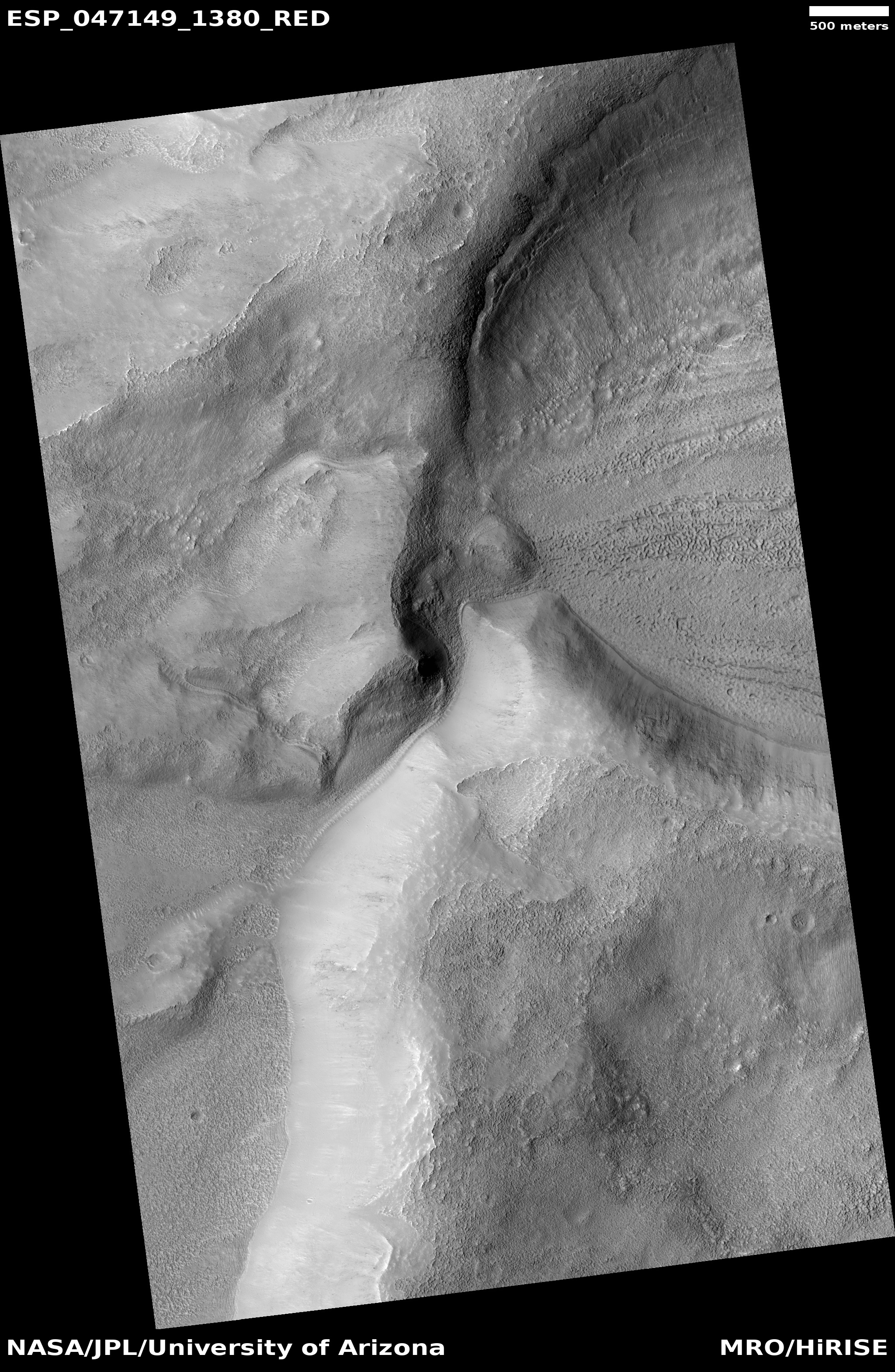
Channel connecting two craters, as seen by HiRISE under HiWish program

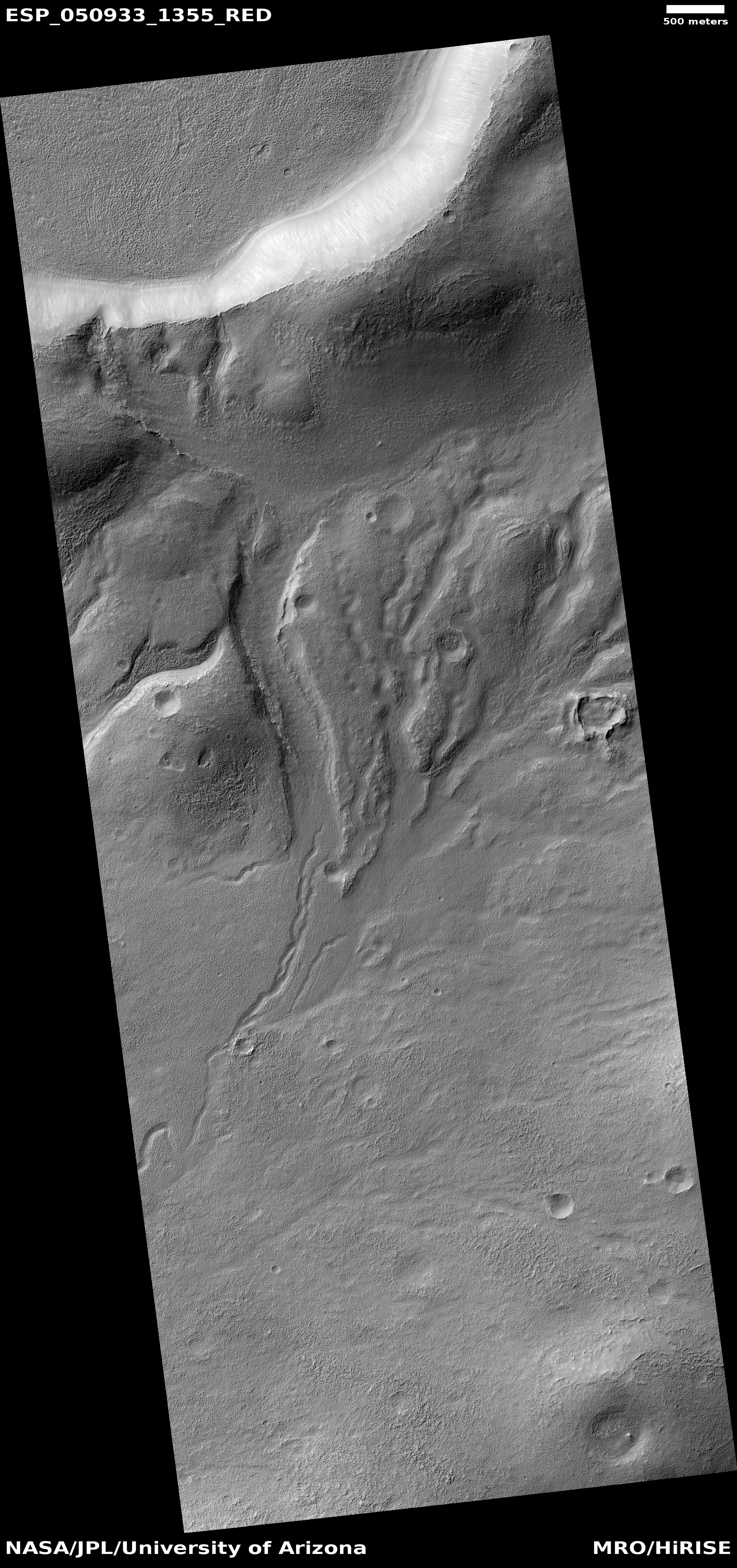
Channels, as seen by HiRISE under HiWish program

== Dust devil tracks ==
Because a thin coating of fine bright dust covers much of the surface of Mars, passing dust devils remove the bright dust and expose the underlying dark surface. The patterns formed by the dust devil tracks change frequently; sometimes in just a few months. Dust devils have been seen from the ground and from orbiting spacecraft. Some dust devils are taller than the average tornado on Earth. They have even blown the dust off of the solar panels of the two Rovers on Mars, thereby greatly extending their lives.

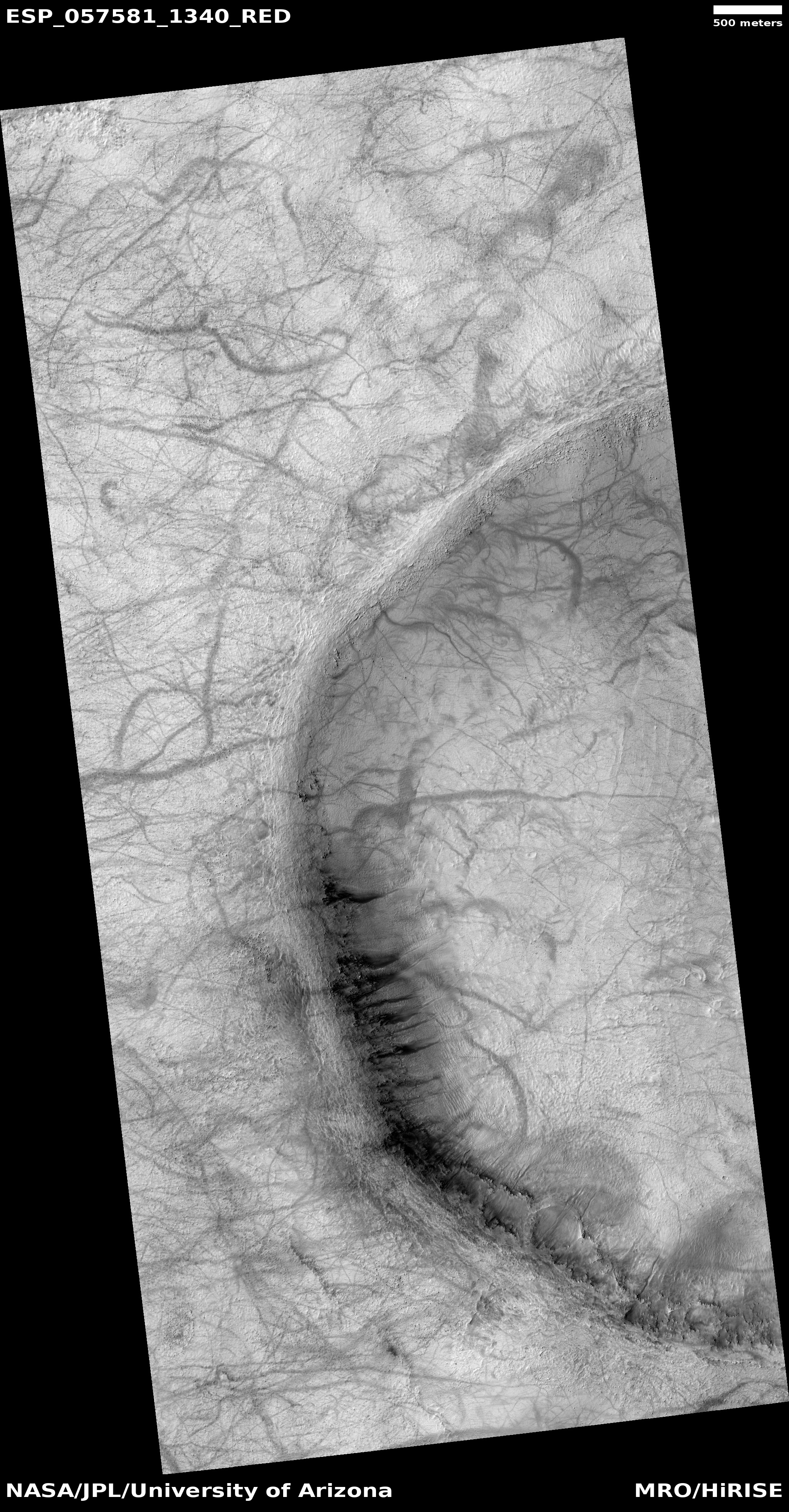
Wide view of dust devil tracks, as seen by HiRISE under HiWish program

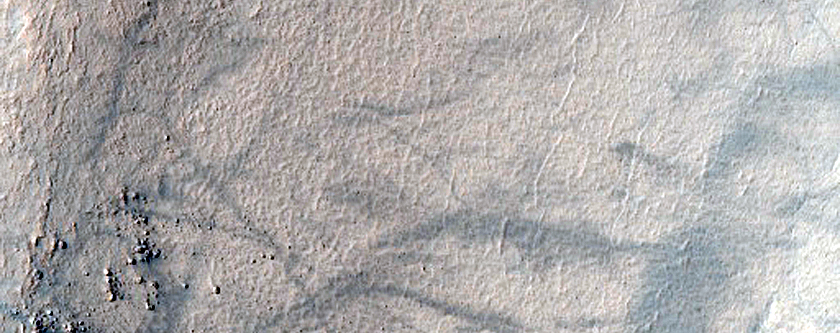
Close view of dust devil tracks, as seen by HiRISE under HiWish program

== See also ==
- Climate of Mars
- Concentric crater fill
- Dunes
- Electris deposits
- Fossa (geology)
- Geology of Mars
- Glaciers on Mars
- Groundwater on Mars
- HiRISE
- HiWish program
- Impact crater
- Latitude dependent mantle
- Linear ridge networks
- List of areas of chaos terrain on Mars
- List of quadrangles on Mars
- Martian chaos terrain
- Martian dichotomy
- Martian Gullies
- MOC Public Targeting Program
- Newton (Martian crater)
- Oxbow lake
- Tectonics of Mars
- Water on Mars

MC-01 Mare Boreum (features)
MC-02 Diacria (features)		MC-03 Arcadia (features)	MC-04 Acidalium (features)	MC-05 Ismenius Lacus (features)		MC-06 Casius (features)	MC-07 Cebrenia (features)
MC-08 Amazonis (features)	MC-09 Tharsis (features)	MC-10 Lunae Palus (features)	MC-11 Oxia Palus (features)	MC-12 Arabia (features)	MC-13 Syrtis Major (features)	MC-14 Amenthes (features)	MC-15 Elysium (features)
MC-16 Memnonia (features)	MC-17 Phoenicis Lacus (features)	MC-18 Coprates (features)	MC-19 Margaritifer Sinus (features)	MC-20 Sinus Sabaeus (features)	MC-21 Iapygia (features)	MC-22 Mare Tyrrhenum (features)	MC-23 Aeolis (features)
MC-24 Phaethontis (features)		MC-25 Thaumasia (features)	MC-26 Argyre (features)	MC-27 Noachis (features)		MC-28 Hellas (features)	MC-29 Eridania (features)
MC-30 Mare Australe (features)
