= Atlantis basin =

Crater on Mars

Atlantis
- Planet: Mars
- Coordinates: 35°S 177°W
- Quadrangle: Phaethontis

Atlantis basin is an eroded impact crater in the southern hemisphere of Mars, in the Phaethontis quadrangle, Sirenum Terrae region, centered at 177° West, 35° South. It was formed during the early Noachian period.

Atlantis basin contains Atlantis Chaos, a region of chaos terrain. It also contains an ancient dry lakebed (possibly part of Eridania Lake), as well as structures that appear to be volcanic dikes and recently formed gullies, which suggests the possibility of long-term hydrothermal activity.

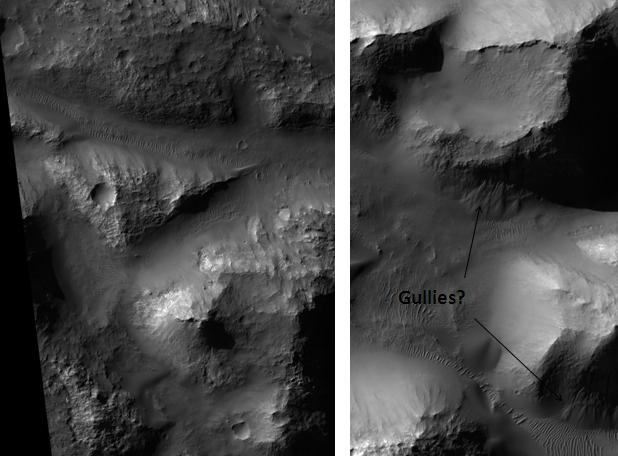
Atlantis Chaos, within the Atlantis basin, as seen by HiRISE. Click on image to see mantle covering and possible gullies. The two images are different parts of the original image. They have different scales.

== See also ==
- Geography of Mars
- Areas of chaos terrain on Mars
