= Tader Valles =

Martian geographical feature

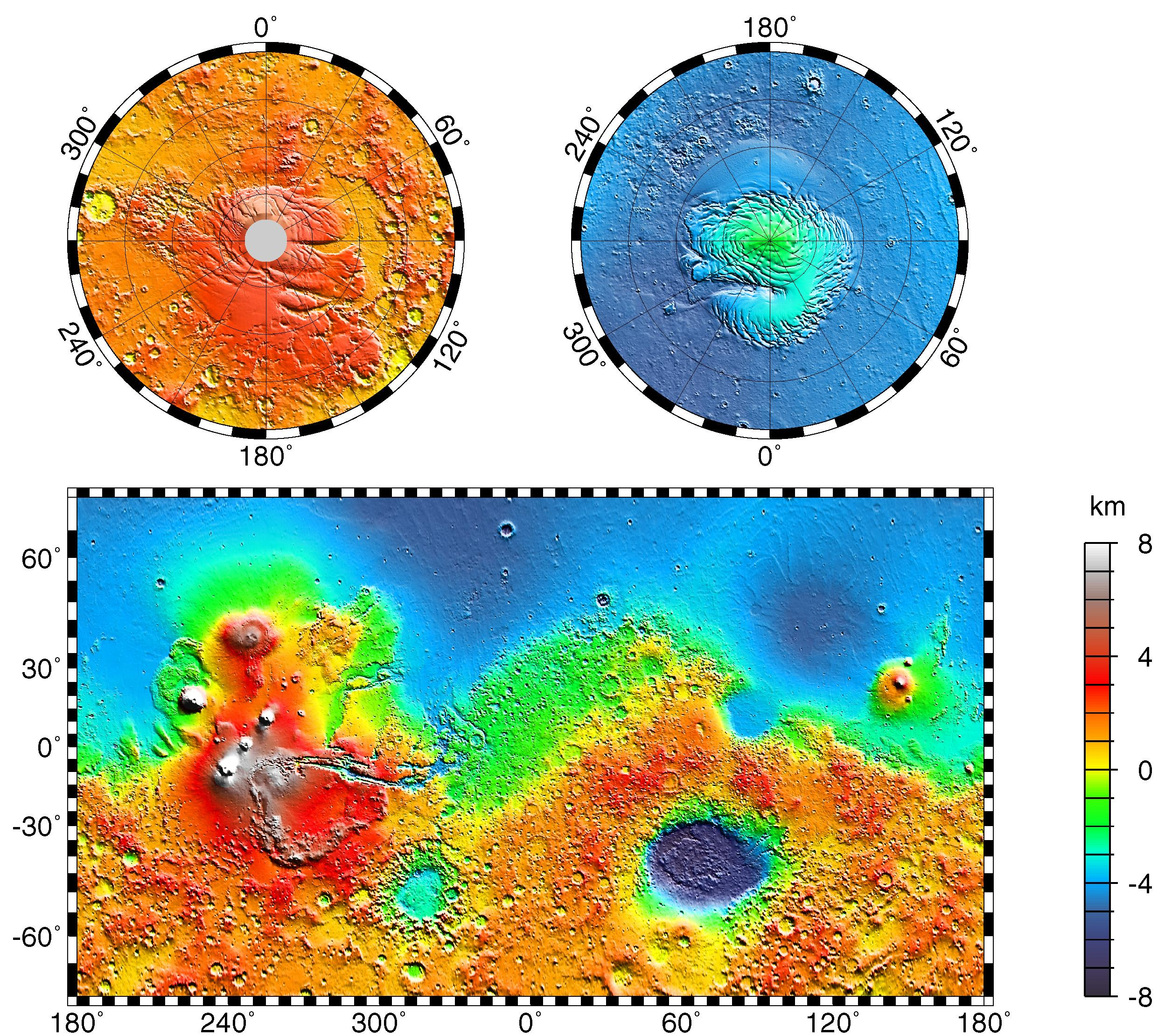
- This topographic map shows volcanic peaks in white because of their great height. Near the equator, a line of three volcanoes points south to Phaethontis and three large craters-the area where there are many gullies. Click on the image for a closer view.
- Coordinates: 49.1°S 152.5°W
- Naming: the ancient name for present Segura River, Spain

The Tader Valles are a set of small channels in the Phaethontis quadrangle found at 49.1° south latitude and 152.5° west longitude. They are named after the ancient name for present Segura River, Spain.

== Ice-rich mantle ==
Much of the surface of Mars is covered by a thick smooth mantle that is thought to be a mixture of ice and dust. This ice-rich mantle, a few yards thick, smooths the land, but in places it has a bumpy texture, resembling the surface of a basketball. Under certain conditions the ice could melt and flow down the slopes to create gullies. Because there are few craters on this mantle, the mantle is relatively young. This mantle probably fills the Tader Valles as shown in the HiRISE image below.

Changes in Mars's orbit and tilt cause significant changes in the distribution of water ice from polar regions down to latitudes equivalent to Texas. During certain climate periods water vapor leaves polar ice and enters the atmosphere. The water comes back to ground at lower latitudes as deposits of frost or snow mixed generously with dust. The atmosphere of Mars contains a great deal of fine dust particles. Water vapor will condense on the particles, then fall down to the ground due to the additional weight of the water coating. When ice at the top of the mantling layer goes back into the atmosphere, it leaves behind dust, which insulates the remaining ice.

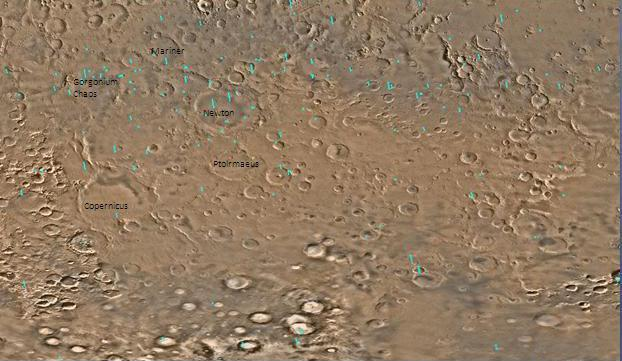
Map of Phaethontis quadrangle. Click on to enlarge and see some crater names.

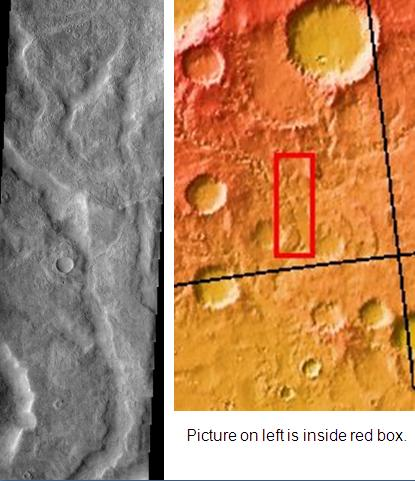
The Tader Valles, as seen by THEMIS. Smooth material in channels may be a mantle in the form of dirty snow.

== See also ==
- Climate of Mars
- Geology of Mars
- Latitude dependent mantle
- Planetary nomenclature
