= Atlantis Chaos =

Chaos on Mars

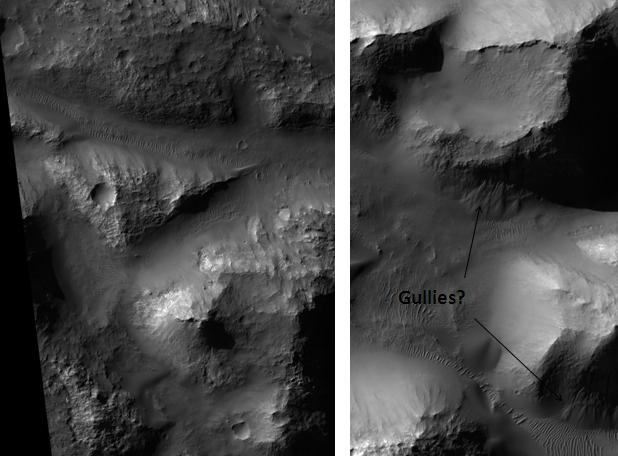
- Atlantis Chaos, as seen by HiRISE. Click on image to see mantle covering and possible gullies. The two images are different parts of the original image. They have different scales.
- Location: Phaethontis quadrangle
- Coordinates: 34°S 177°W

Atlantis Chaos is a region of chaos terrain in the Phaethontis quadrangle of Mars. It is located around 34.7° south latitude, and 177.6° west longitude. It is encompassed by the Atlantis basin. The region is 162 kilometers (101 mi) across, and was named after an albedo feature at 30° S, 173° W.

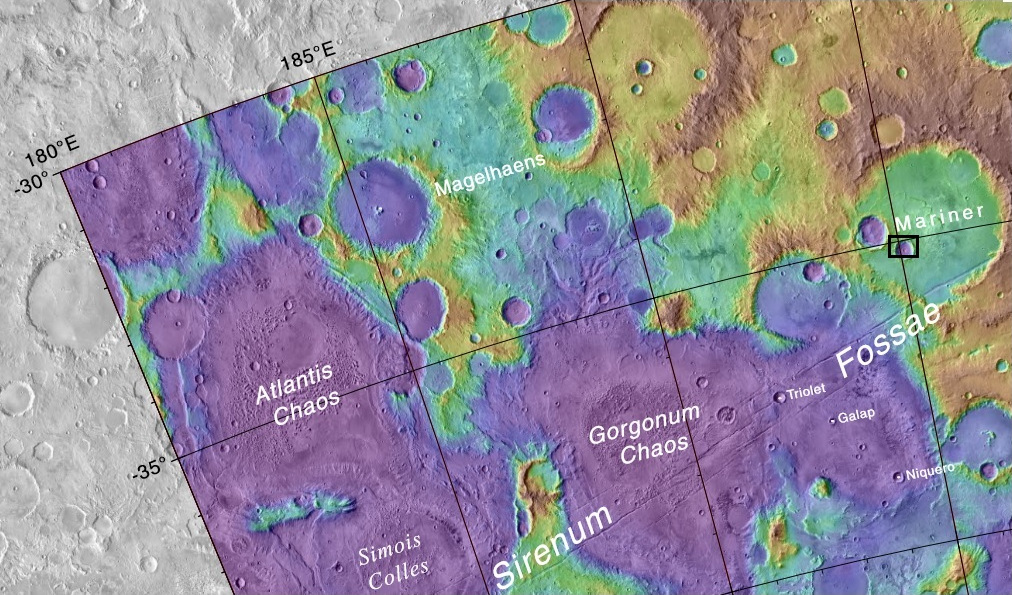
Map showing relative positions of Atlantis Chaos, Gorgonum Chaos, Magelhaens Crater and Simois Colles

== See also ==
- List of areas of chaos terrain on Mars
