= Icaria Fossae =

Fossae on Mars

- Icaria Fossae Graben, as seen by HiRISE. Click on image for a better view of Dust Devil Tracks.
- Feature type: Trough system
- Coordinates: 46.4°S 123.8°W

Icaria Fossae is a system of troughs in the Phaethontis quadrangle of Mars with its location centered at 46.4° south latitude and 123.8° west longitude. It is 280 km long and was named after an albedo feature at 44S, 130W.

Fossae are large troughs (long narrow depressions) in the geographical language used for Mars. This term is derived from Latin; therefore fossa is singular and fossae is plural. Troughs form when the crust is stretched until it breaks. The stretching can be due to the large weight of a nearby volcano. Studies have shown that the volcanoes of Tharsis caused most of the major fossae on Mars. The stress that caused the fossae and other tectonic features is centered in Noctis Labyrinthus, at 4 S and 253 E. But the center has moved somewhat over time.

== See also ==
- Fossa (geology)
- Geology of Mars
- HiRISE
