= Eridania Planitia =

Planitia on Mars

- Feature type: Plains
- Location: Eridania quadrangle, Mars
- Coordinates: 38.15°S 122.21°E
- Diameter: 1,062.13 km (659.98 mi)
- Eponym: Lands of Eridanos

Eridania Planitia is a plain located in the southern highlands of Mars. It borders the Hellas basin to the west, Promethei Terra to the south, and the massive shield volcano Hesperia Planum to the north. The name "Eridania Planitia" was approved by the International Astronomical Union (IAU) on 22 September 2010; it is named after the closest classical albedo feature.

== Characteristics ==
As with much of the Martian southern highlands, Eridania Planitia is ancient, with an estimated age of roughly 3.7–4 billion years old. However, subregions within the plains are younger, with a large depression (informally named the "Morpheos basin") likely forming within a period spanning between 3.52 and 3.67 billion years ago. Additionally, Eridania Planitia is host to a concentration of expanded craters, indicating an ice-rich subsurface.

== See also ==
- List of plains on Mars
- Eridania Lake
