= Terra Sirenum =

Region on Mars

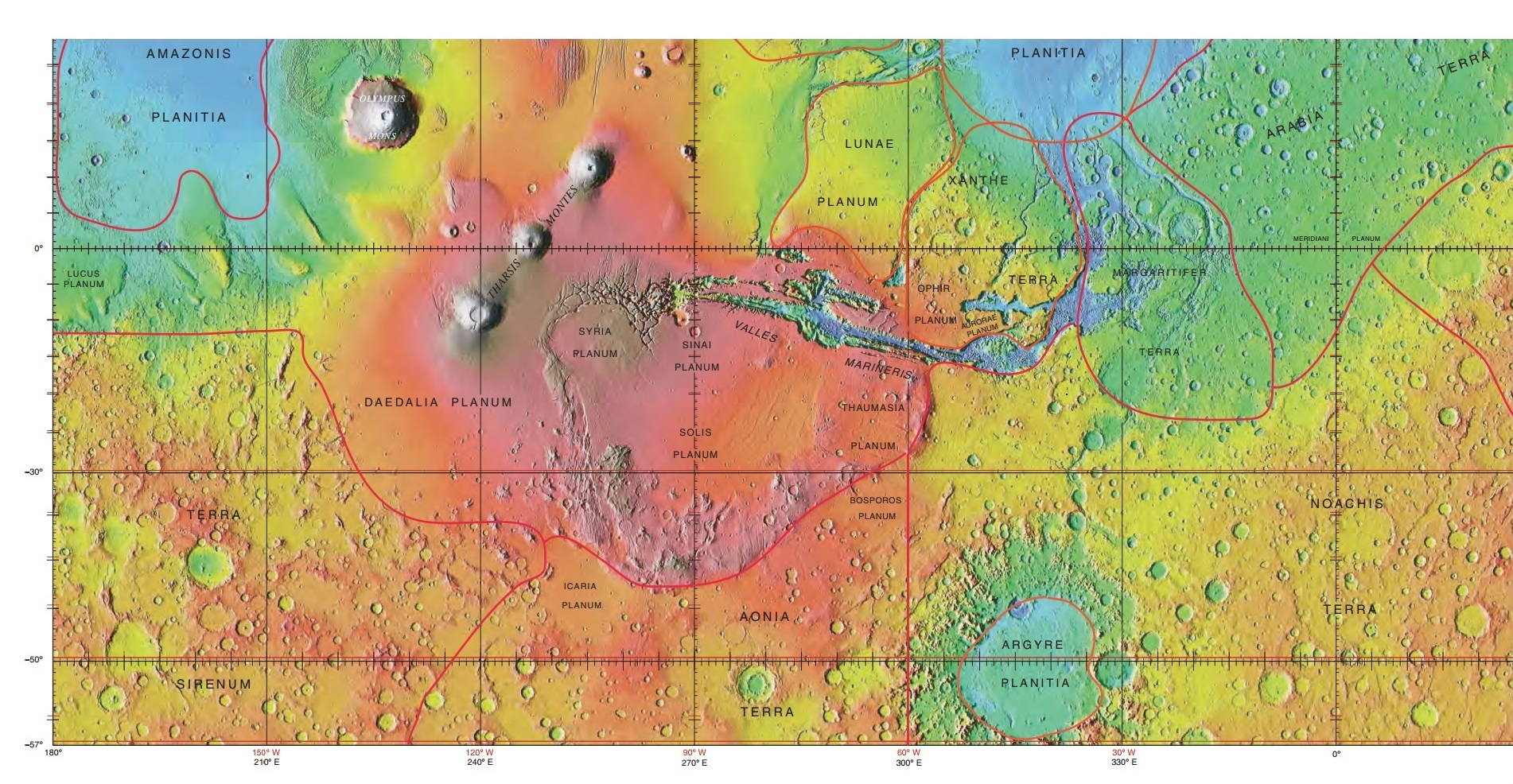
MOLA map showing boundaries of Terra Sirenum and other regions

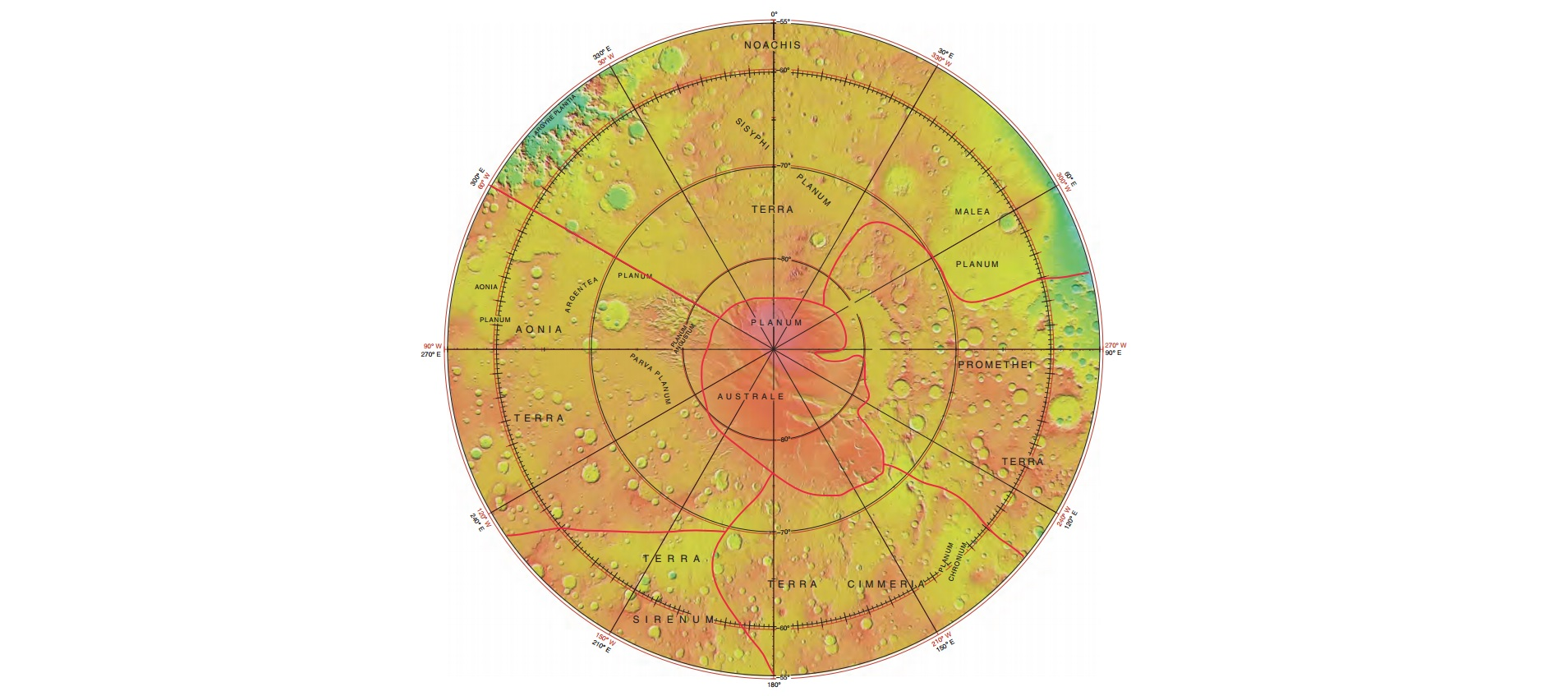
MOLA map showing boundaries of Terra Sirenum near the south pole and other regions

Terra Sirenum is a large region in the southern hemisphere of the planet Mars. It is centered at 39.7°S 150°W and covers 3900 km at its broadest extent. It covers latitudes 10 to 70 South and longitudes 110 to 180 W. Terra Sirenum is an upland area notable for massive cratering including the large Newton Crater. Terra Sirenum is in the Phaethontis quadrangle and the Memnonia quadrangle of Mars. A low area in Terra Sirenum is believed to have once held a lake that eventually drained through Ma'adim Vallis.

Terra Sirenum is named after the Sirens, who were birds with the heads of girls. In the Odyssey these girls captured passing seamen and killed them.

== Chloride deposits ==
Evidence of deposits of chloride based minerals in Terra Sirenum was discovered by the 2001 Mars Odyssey orbiter's Thermal Emission Imaging System in March 2008. The deposits are approximately 3.5 to 3.9 billion years old. This suggests that near-surface water was widespread in early Martian history, which has implications for the possible existence of Martian life. Besides finding chlorides, MRO discovered iron/magnesium smectites which are formed from long exposure in water.

Based on chloride deposits and hydrated phyllosilicates, Alfonso Davila and others believe there is an ancient lakebed in Terra Sirenum that had an area of 30,000 km^{2} and was 200 meters deep. Other evidence that supports this lake are normal and inverted channels like ones found in the Atacama Desert.

== Inverted relief ==
Some areas of Mars show inverted relief, where features that were once depressions, like streams, are now above the surface. It is believed that materials like large rocks were deposited in low-lying areas. Later, erosion (perhaps wind which can't move large rocks) removed much of the surface layers, but left behind the more resistant deposits. Other ways of making inverted relief might be lava flowing down a stream bed or materials being cemented by minerals dissolved in water. On Earth, materials cemented by silica are highly resistant to all kinds of erosional forces. Examples of inverted channels on Earth are found in the Cedar Mountain Formation near Green River, Utah. Inverted relief in the shape of streams are further evidence of water flowing on the Martian surface in past times.

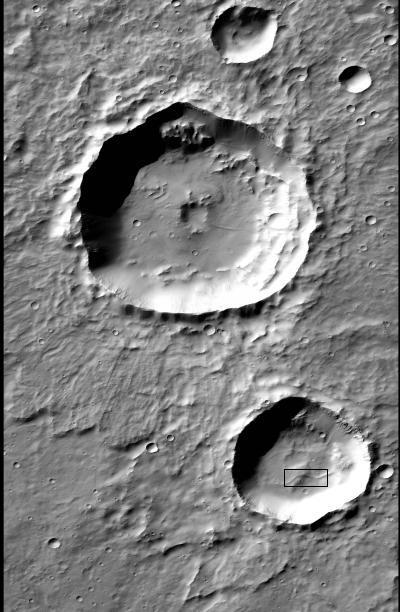
CTX image of craters with black box showing location of next image

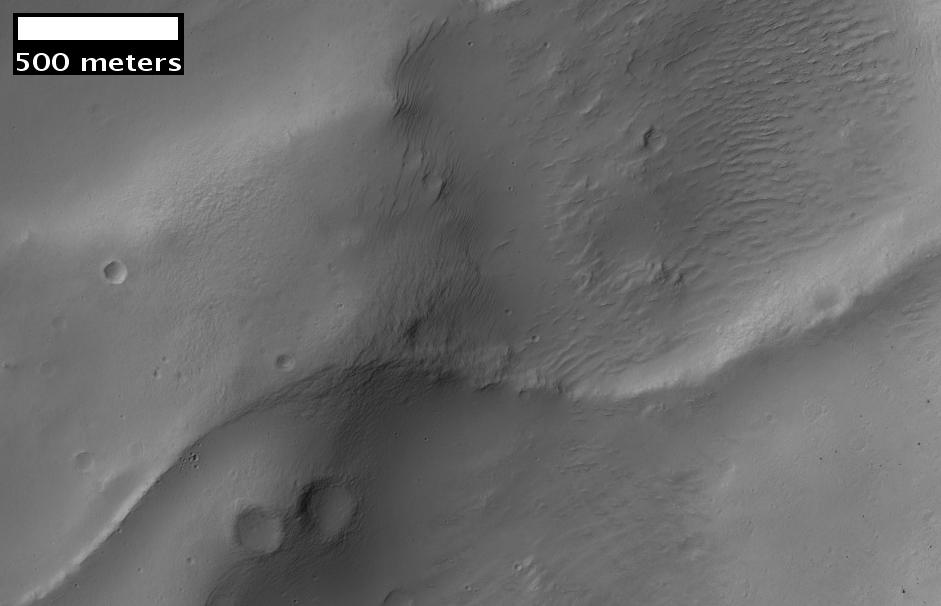
Image from previous photo of a curved ridge that may be an old stream that has become inverted. Image taken with HiRISE under the HiWish program

== Martian gullies ==
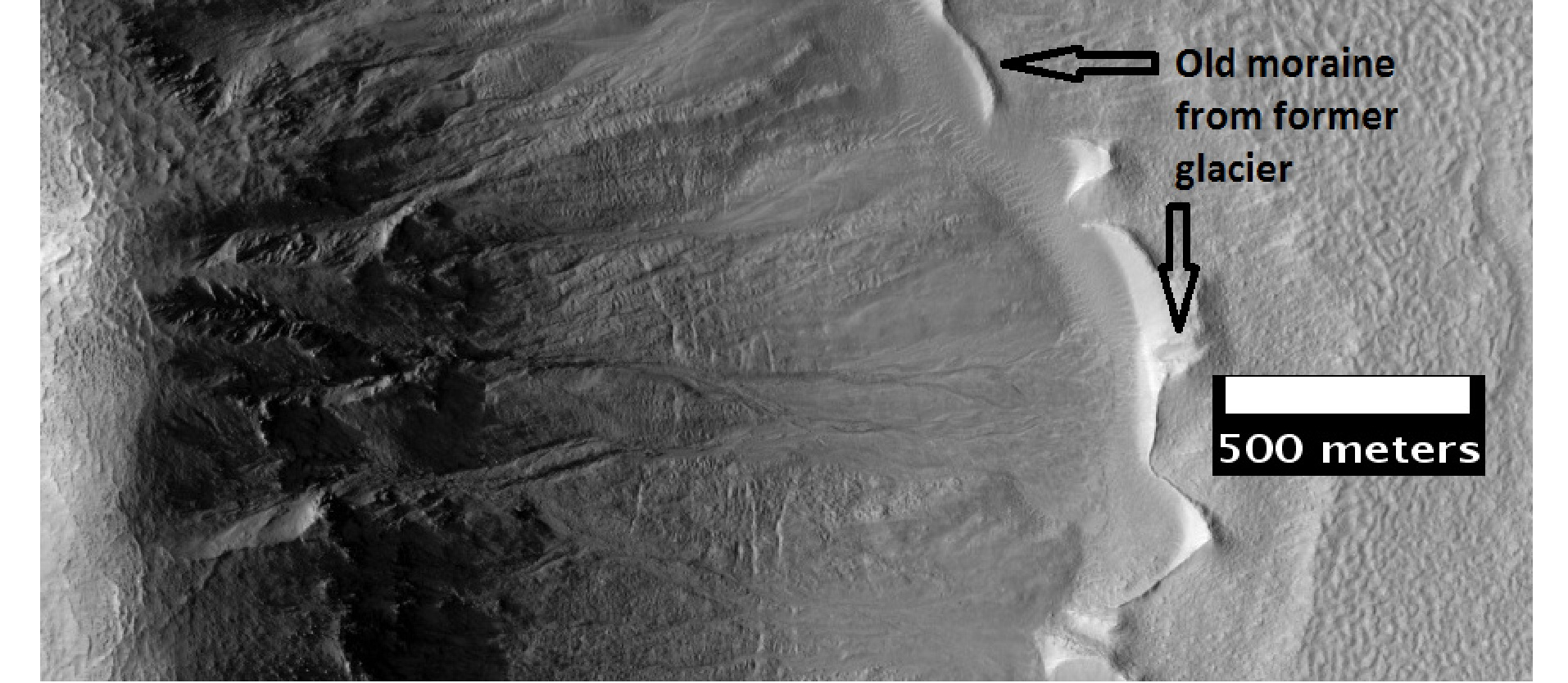
Gullies with remains of a former glacier in crater in Terra Sirenum, as seen by HiRISE under HiWish program

Terra Sirenum is the location of many Martian gullies that may be due to recent flowing water. Some are found in the Gorgonum Chaos and in many craters near the large craters Copernicus and Newton. Gullies occur on steep slopes, especially on the walls of craters. Gullies are believed to be relatively young because they have few, if any craters. Moreover, they lie on top of sand dunes which themselves are considered to be quite young.

== Possible pingos ==
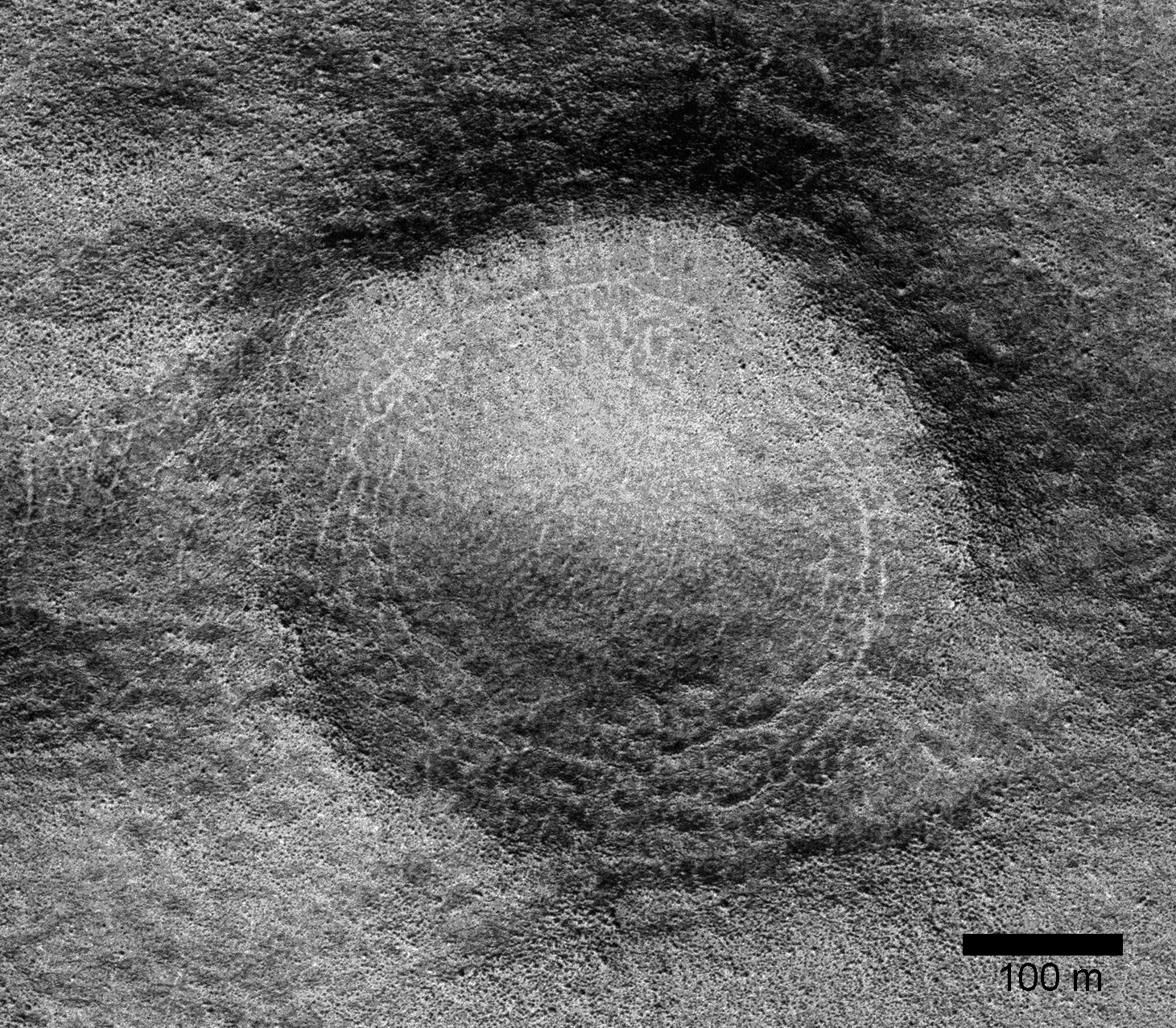
Close view of possible pingo with scale, as seen by HiRISE under HiWish program

The radial and concentric cracks visible here are common when forces penetrate a brittle layer, such as a rock thrown through a glass window. These particular fractures were probably created by something emerging from below the brittle Martian surface. Ice may have accumulated under the surface in a lens shape; thus making these cracked mounds. Ice being less dense than rock, pushed upwards on the surface and generated these spider web-like patterns. A similar process creates similar sized mounds in arctic tundra on Earth. Such features are called pingos. Pingos would contain pure water ice; thus they could be sources of water for future colonists of Mars.

== Concentric crater fill ==
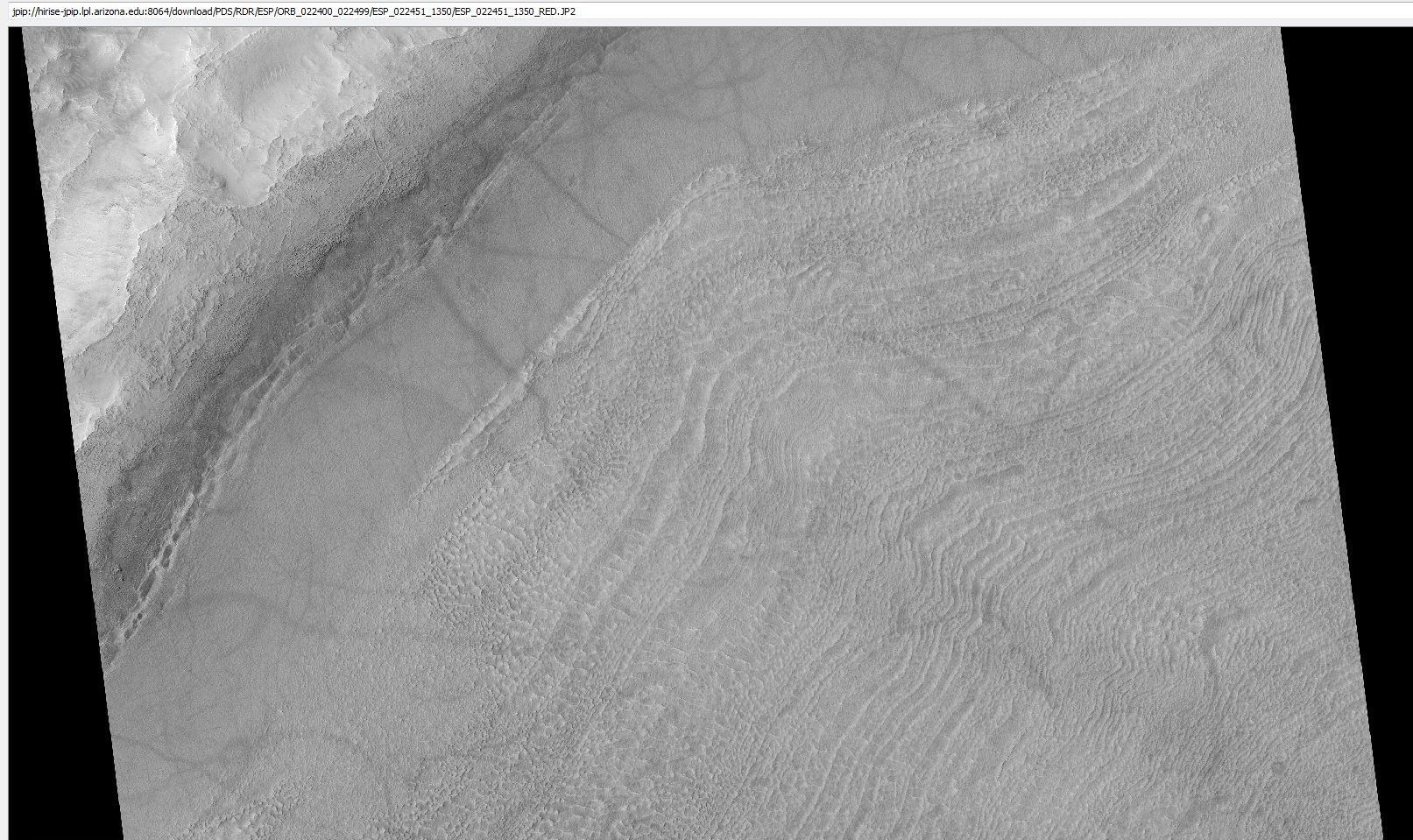
Close-up view of concentric crater fill in a crater located in the Phaethontis quadrangle, as seen by HiRISE under HiWish program

Concentric crater fill, like lobate debris aprons and lineated valley fill, is believed to be ice-rich. Based on accurate topography measures of height at different points in these craters and calculations of how deep the craters should be based on their diameters, it is thought that the craters are 80% filled with mostly ice. That is, they hold hundreds of meters of material that probably consists of ice with a few tens of meters of surface debris. The ice accumulated in the crater from snowfall in previous climates. Recent modeling suggests that concentric crater fill develops over many cycles in which snow is deposited, then moves into the crater. Once inside the crater shade and dust preserve the snow. The snow changes to ice. The many concentric lines are created by the many cycles of snow accumulation. Generally snow accumulates whenever the axial tilt reaches 35 degrees.

== Magnetic stripes and plate tectonics ==
The Mars Global Surveyor (MGS) discovered magnetic stripes in the crust of Mars, especially in the Phaethontis and Eridania quadrangles (Terra Cimmeria and Terra Sirenum). The magnetometer on MGS discovered 100 km wide stripes of magnetized crust running roughly parallel for up to 2000 km. These stripes alternate in polarity with the north magnetic pole of one pointing up from the surface and the north magnetic pole of the next pointing down. When similar stripes were discovered on Earth in the 1960s, they were taken as evidence of plate tectonics. Researchers believe these magnetic stripes on Mars are evidence for a short, early period of plate tectonic activity. When the rocks became solid they retained the magnetism that existed at the time. A magnetic field of a planet is believed to be caused by fluid motions under the surface. However, there are some differences, between the magnetic stripes on Earth and those on Mars. The Martian stripes are wider, much more strongly magnetized, and do not appear to spread out from a middle crustal spreading zone. Because the area containing the magnetic stripes is about 4 billion years old, it is believed that the global magnetic field probably lasted for only the first few hundred million years of Mars' life, when the temperature of the molten iron in the planet's core might have been high enough to mix it into a magnetic dynamo. There are no magnetic fields near large impact basins like Hellas. The shock of the impact may have erased the remnant magnetization in the rock. So, magnetism produced by early fluid motion in the core would not have existed after the impacts.

When molten rock containing magnetic material, such as hematite (Fe_{2}O_{3}), cools and solidifies in the presence of a magnetic field, it becomes magnetized and takes on the polarity of the background field. This magnetism is lost only if the rock is subsequently heated above a particular temperature (the Curie point which is 770 °C for iron). The magnetism left in rocks is a record of the magnetic field when the rock solidified.

== See also ==
- Climate of Mars
- Geology of Mars
- Glaciers on Mars
- Groundwater on Mars
- Impact crater
- List of craters on Mars
- Martian gullies

== Recommended reading ==
- Grotzinger, J. and R. Milliken (eds.). 2012. Sedimentary Geology of Mars. SEPM.
- Lorenz, R. 2014. The Dune Whisperers. The Planetary Report: 34, 1, 8–14
- Lorenz, R., J. Zimbelman. 2014. Dune Worlds: How Windblown Sand Shapes Planetary Landscapes. Springer Praxis Books / Geophysical Sciences.
