= Eridania quadrangle =

Map of Mars

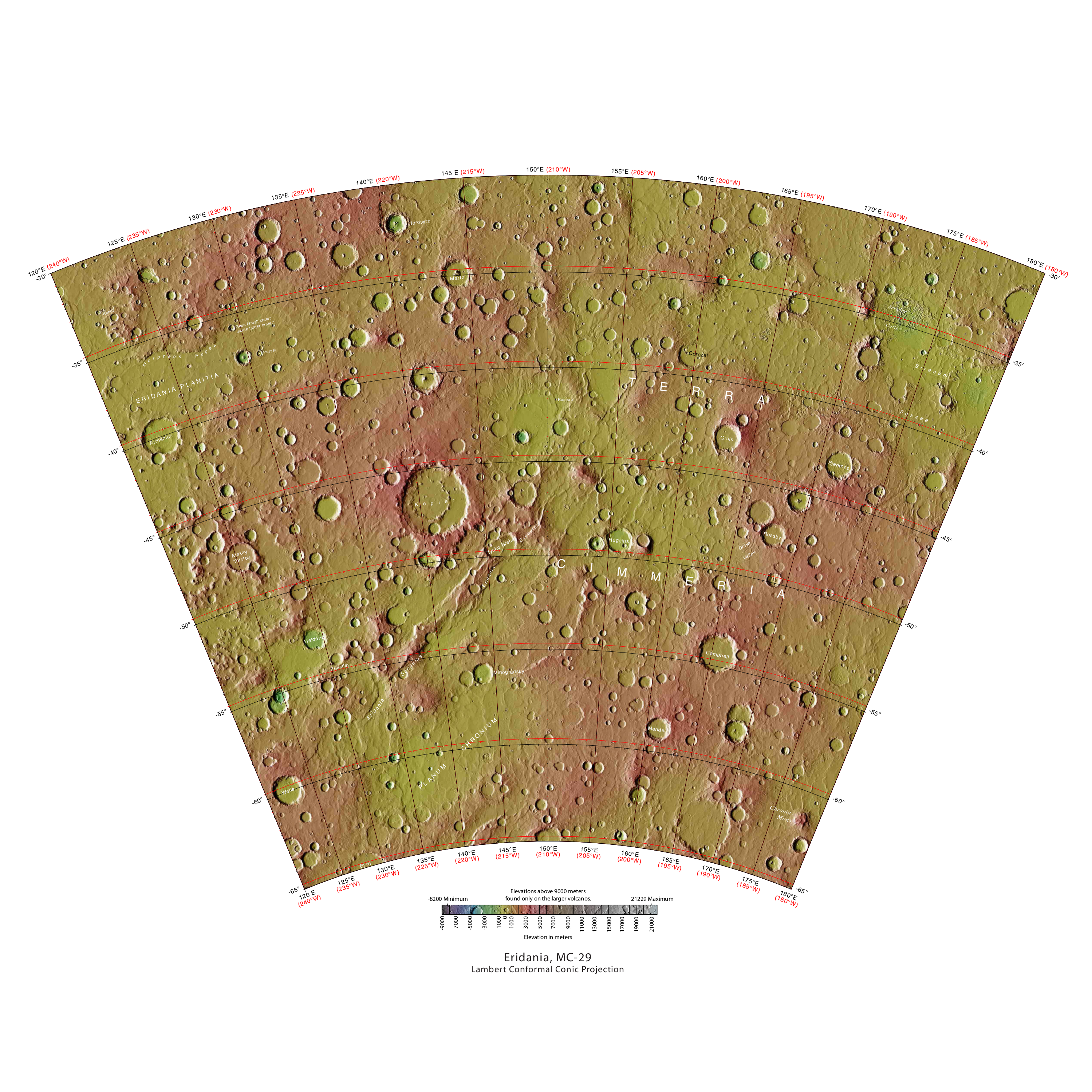
- Map of Eridania quadrangle from Mars Orbiter Laser Altimeter (MOLA) data. The highest elevations are red and the lowest are blue.
- Coordinates: 47.5°S 210°W

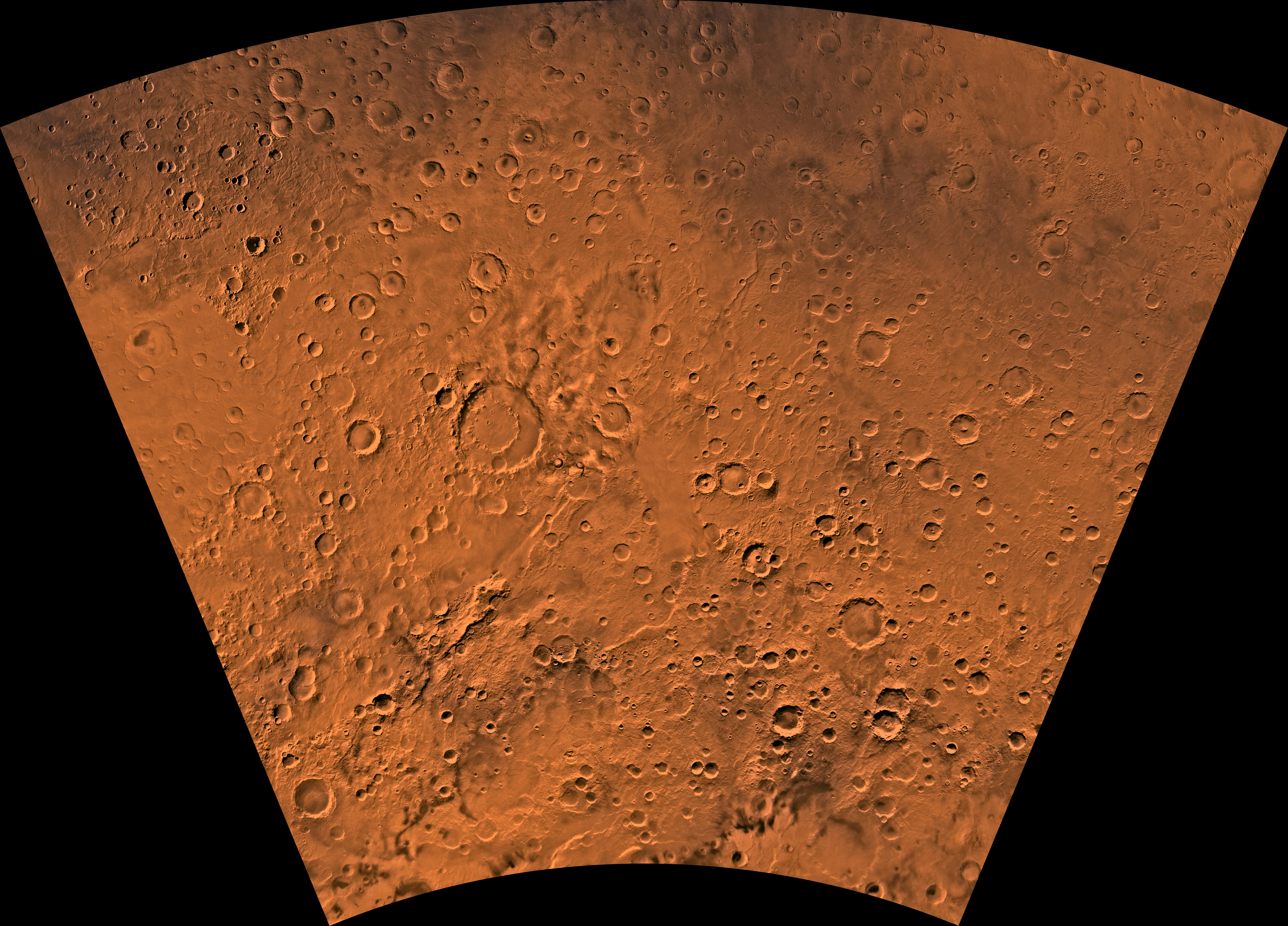
Image of the Eridania Quadrangle (MC-29). The region mainly includes heavily cratered highlands. The west-central part includes Kepler Crater.

The Eridania quadrangle is one of a series of 30 quadrangle maps of Mars used by the United States Geological Survey (USGS) Astrogeology Research Program. The Eridania quadrangle is also referred to as MC-29 (Mars Chart-29).

The Eridania quadrangle lies between 30° and 65° south latitude and 180° and 240° west longitude on the planet Mars. Most of the classic region named Terra Cimmeria is found within this quadrangle. It is named after a region on the Po River, Italy. The name was approved by the IAUP in 1958.

Part of the Electris deposits, a 100–200 meters thick, light-toned deposit covers the Eridania quadrangle. Many slopes in Eridania contain gullies, which are believed to be caused by flowing water.

== Martian gullies ==
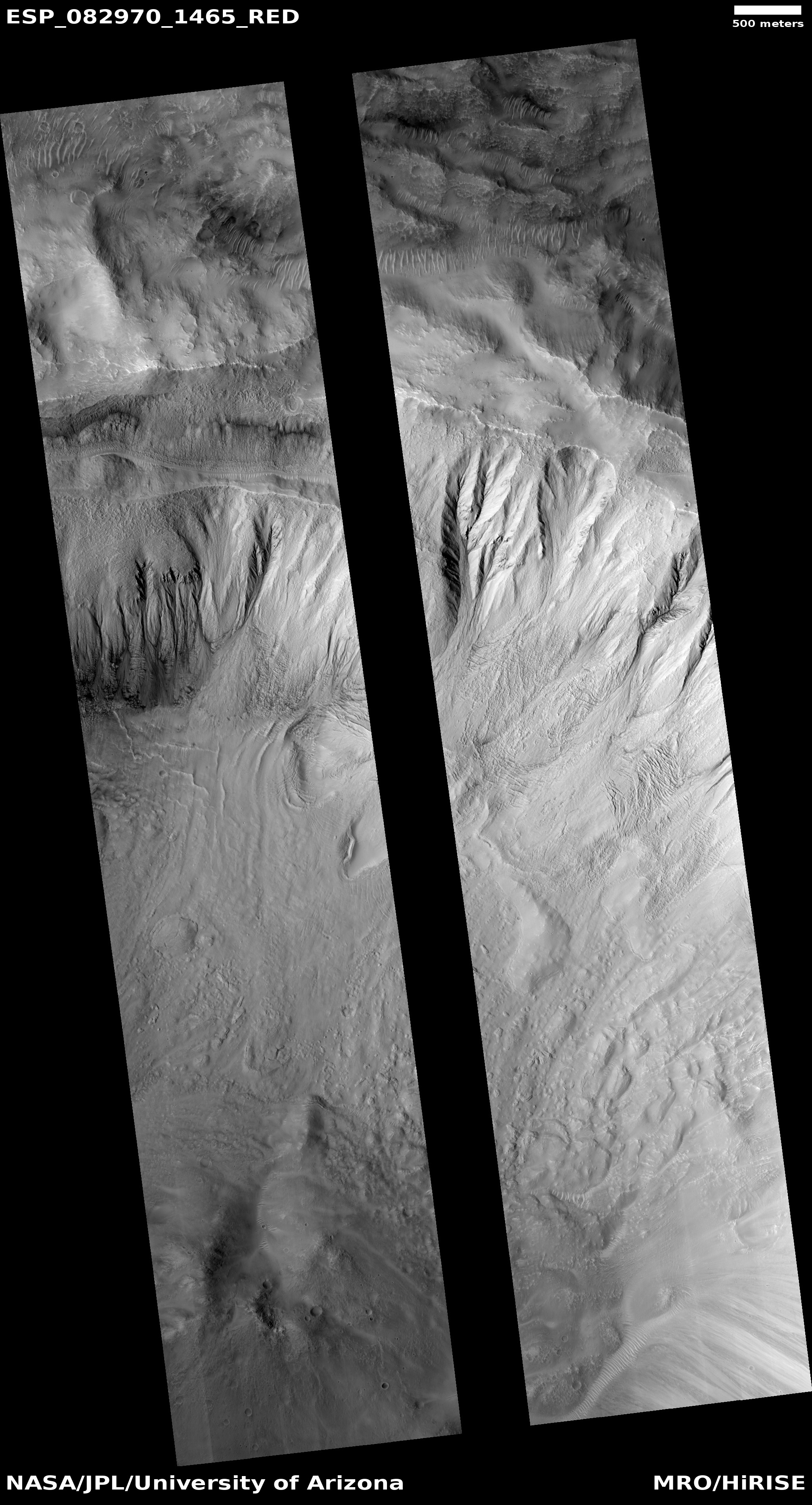
Wide view of gullies in a crater, as seen by HiRISE under HiWish program The black strip is where data were not gathered. This image was named HiRISE Picture of the Day for June 25, 2024.

The Eridania quadrangle is the location of gullies that may be due to recent flowing water. Gullies occur on steep slopes, especially on the walls of craters. Gullies are believed to be relatively young because they have few, if any craters. Moreover, they lie on top of sand dunes which themselves are considered to be quite young. Usually, each gully has an alcove, channel, and apron. Some studies have found that gullies occur on slopes that face all directions, others have found that the greater number of gullies are found on poleward facing slopes, especially from 30-44 S.

Although many ideas have been put forward to explain them, the most popular involve liquid water coming from an aquifer, from melting at the base of old glaciers, or from the melting of ice in the ground when the climate was warmer. Because of the good possibility that liquid water was involved with their formation and that they could be very young, scientist believe gullies are where we may be able to find life.

There is evidence for all three theories. Most of the gully alcove heads occur at the same level, just as one would expect of an aquifer. Various measurements and calculations show that liquid water could exist in aquifers at the usual depths where gullies begin. One variation of this model is that rising hot magma could have melted ice in the ground and caused water to flow in aquifers. Aquifers are layer that allow water to flow. They may consist of porous sandstone. The aquifer layer would be perched on top of another layer that prevents water from going down (in geological terms it would be called impermeable). Because water in an aquifer is prevented from going down, the only direction the trapped water can flow is horizontally. Eventually, water could flow out onto the surface when the aquifer reaches a break—like a crater wall. The resulting flow of water could erode the wall to create gullies. Aquifers are quite common on Earth. A good example is "Weeping Rock" in Zion National Park Utah.

As for the next theory, much of the surface of Mars is covered by a thick smooth mantle that is thought to be a mixture of ice and dust. This ice-rich mantle, a few yards thick, smooths the land, but in places it has a bumpy texture, resembling the surface of a basketball. The mantle may be like a glacier and under certain conditions the ice that is mixed in the mantle could melt and flow down the slopes and make gullies. Because there are few craters on this mantle, the mantle is relatively young. An excellent view of this mantle is shown below in the picture of the Ptolemaeus Crater Rim, as seen by HiRISE. The ice-rich mantle may be the result of climate changes. Changes in Mars's orbit and tilt cause significant changes in the distribution of water ice from polar regions down to latitudes equivalent to Texas. During certain climate periods, water vapor leaves polar ice and enters the atmosphere. The water comes back to ground at lower latitudes as deposits of frost or snow mixed generously with dust. The atmosphere of Mars contains a great deal of fine dust particles. Water vapor will condense on the particles, then fall down to the ground due to the additional weight of the water coating. When Mars is at its greatest tilt or obliquity, up to 2 cm of ice could be removed from the summer ice cap and deposited at midlatitudes. This movement of water could last for several thousand years and create a snow layer of up to around 10 meters thick. When ice at the top of the mantling layer goes back into the atmosphere, it leaves behind dust, which insulating the remaining ice. Measurements of altitudes and slopes of gullies support the idea that snowpacks or glaciers are associated with gullies. Steeper slopes have more shade which would preserve snow. Higher elevations have far fewer gullies because ice would tend to sublimate more in the thin air of the higher altitude.

The third theory might be possible since climate changes may be enough to simply allow ice in the ground to melt and thus form the gullies. During a warmer climate, the first few meters of ground could thaw and produce a "debris flow" similar to those on the dry and cold Greenland east coast. Since the gullies occur on steep slopes only a small decrease of the shear strength of the soil particles is needed to begin the flow. Small amounts of liquid water from melted ground ice could be enough. Calculations show that a third of a mm of runoff can be produced each day for 50 days of each Martian year, even under current conditions.

== Dust devil tracks ==
Many areas on Mars, including Eridania, experience the passage of giant dust devils. A thin coating of fine bright dust covers most of the Martian surface. When a dust devil goes by it blows away the coating and exposes the underlying dark surface.

Dust devils occur when the sun warms up the air near a flat, dry surface. The warm air then rises quickly through the cooler air and begins spinning while moving ahead. This spinning, moving cell may pick up dust and sand then leave behind a clean surface.

Dust devils have been seen from the ground and high overhead from orbit. They have even blown the dust off of the solar panels of the two Rovers on Mars, thereby greatly extending their lives. The twin Rovers were designed to last for 3 months, instead they lasted more than six years, and one is still going after 8 years. The pattern of the tracks have been shown to change every few months.

A study that combined data from the High Resolution Stereo Camera (HRSC) and the Mars Orbiter Camera (MOC) found that some large dust devils on Mars have a diameter of 700 meters and last at least 26 minutes.

== Paleomagnetism ==
The Mars Global Surveyor (MGS) discovered magnetic stripes in the crust of Mars, especially in the Phaethontis and Eridania quadrangles (Terra Cimmeria and Terra Sirenum). The magnetometer on MGS discovered 100 km wide stripes of magnetized crust running roughly parallel for up to 2000 km. These stripes alternate in polarity with the north magnetic pole of one pointing up from the surface and the north magnetic pole of the next pointing down. When similar stripes were discovered on Earth in the 1960s, they were taken as evidence of plate tectonics. Researchers believe these magnetic stripes on Mars are evidence for a short, early period of plate tectonic activity. When the rocks became solid they retained the magnetism that existed at the time. A magnetic field of a planet is believed to be caused by fluid motions under the surface. However, there are some differences, between the magnetic stripes on Earth and those on Mars. The Martian stripes are wider, much more strongly magnetized, and do not appear to spread out from a middle crustal spreading zone. Because the area containing the magnetic stripes is about 4 billion years old, it is believed that the global magnetic field probably lasted for only the first few hundred million years of Mars' life, when the temperature of the molten iron in the planet's core might have been high enough to mix it into a magnetic dynamo. There are no magnetic fields near large impact basins like Hellas. The shock of the impact may have erased the remnant magnetization in the rock. So, magnetism produced by early fluid motion in the core would not have existed after the impacts.

Some researchers have proposed that early in its history Mars exhibited a form of plate tectonics. At about 3.93 billion years ago Mars became a one plate planet with a superplume under Tharsis.

When molten rock containing magnetic material, such as hematite (Fe_{2}O_{3}), cools and solidifies in the presence of a magnetic field, it becomes magnetized and takes on the polarity of the background field. This magnetism is lost only if the rock is subsequently heated above a particular temperature (the Curie point which is 770 °C for iron). The magnetism left in rocks is a record of the magnetic field when the rock solidified.

== Dunes ==
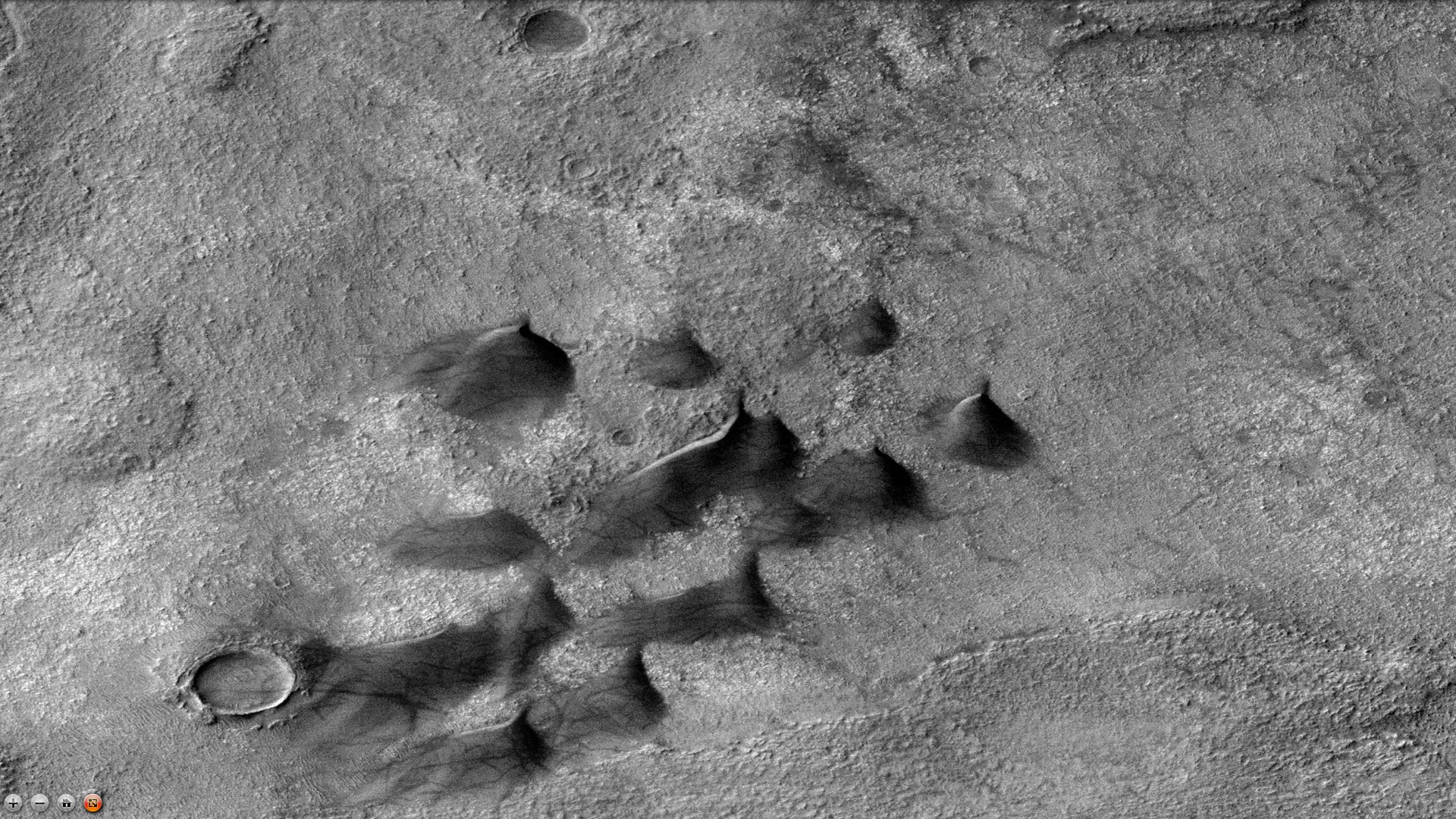
Dunes and dust devil tracks on floor of Huggins Crater, as seen by CTX camera (on Mars Reconnaissance Orbiter). Dark streaks on dunes are dust devil tracks.

Dunes, including barchans are present in the Eridania quadrangle and some pictures below. When there are perfect conditions for producing sand dunes, steady wind in one direction and just enough sand, a barchan sand dune forms. Barchans have a gentle slope on the wind side and a much steeper slope on the lee side where horns or a notch often forms. The whole dune may appear to move with the wind. Observing dunes on Mars can tell us how strong the winds are, as well as their direction. If pictures are taken at regular intervals, one may see changes in the dunes or possibly in ripples on the dune’s surface. On Mars dunes are often dark in color because they were formed from the common, volcanic rock basalt. In the dry environment, dark minerals in basalt, like olivine and pyroxene, do not break down as they do on Earth. Although rare, some dark sand is found on Hawaii which also has many volcanoes discharging basalt. Barchan is a Russian term because this type of dune was first seen in the desert regions of Turkistan. Some of the wind on Mars is created when the dry ice at the poles is heated in the spring. At that time, the solid carbon dioxide (dry ice) sublimates or changes directly to a gas and rushes away at high speeds. Each Martian year 30% of the carbon dioxide in the atmosphere freezes out and covers the pole that is experiencing winter, so there is a great potential for strong winds.

== Glacial features ==
Glaciers, loosely defined as patches of currently or recently flowing ice, are thought to be present across large but restricted areas of the modern Martian surface, and are inferred to have been more widely distributed at times in the past. Lobate convex features on the surface known as viscous flow features and lobate debris aprons, which show the characteristics of non-Newtonian flow, are now almost unanimously regarded as true glaciers. Today, after years of observations, we consider lobate debris aprons (LDA's) and lineated valley fill (LVF) basically the same--mostly ice with a covering of debris, their shapes (and names) are dependent on their locations. When confined within a valley, LVF is present; in contrast when not confined, this flowing debris covered ice spreads out to form LDA's.

== Lake ==
The Eridania Basin, located near 180 E and 30 South, is thought to have contained a large lake with a depth of 1 km in places. The basin is composed of a group of eroded and connected topographically impact basins. The lake has been estimated to have an area of 3,000,000 square kilometers. Water from this lake entered Ma'adim Vallis which starts at the lake's north boundary. It is surrounded by valley networks that all end at the same elevation, suggesting that they emptied into a lake. Magnesium-rich clay minerals and opaline silica have been detected in the area. These minerals are consistent with the presence of a large lake.

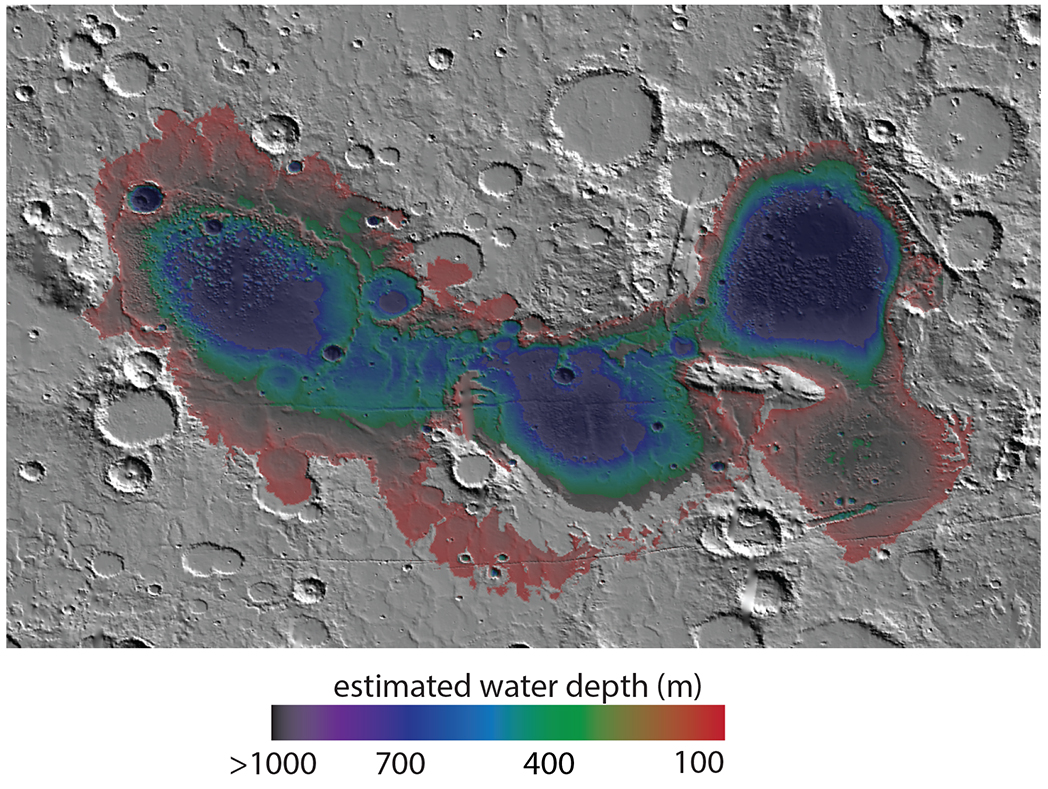
Map showing estimated water depth in different parts of Eridania Sea. This map is about 530 miles across.

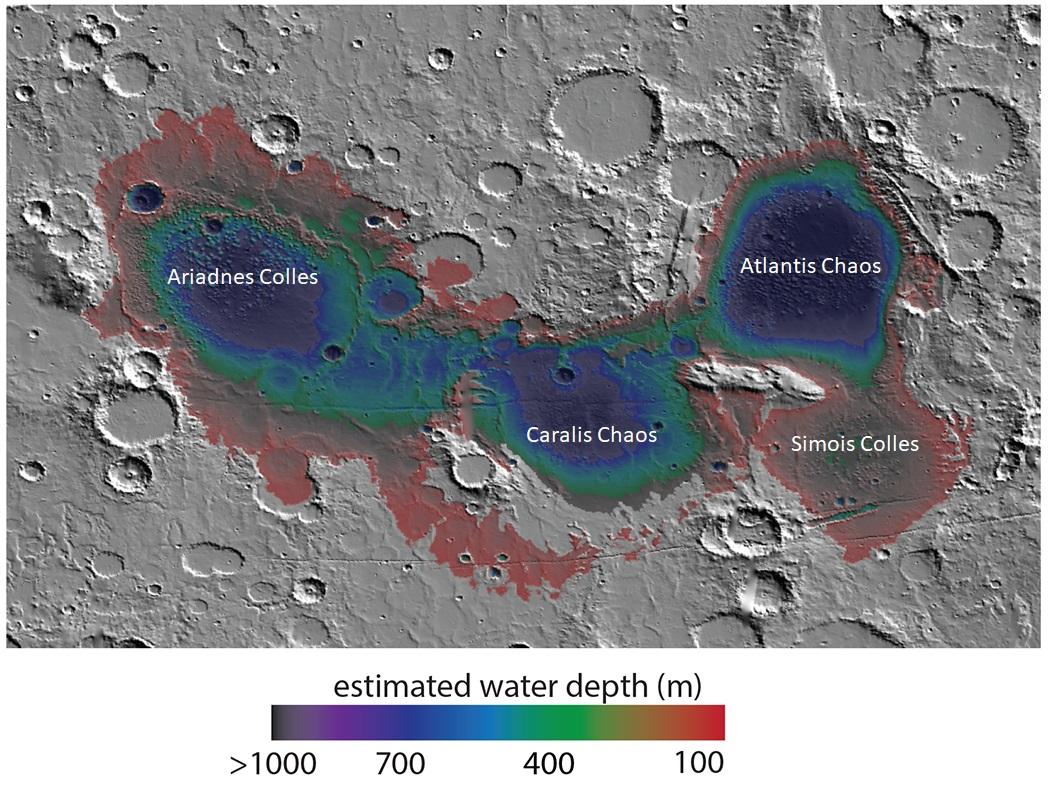
Features around Eridania Sea labeled

The region of this lake shows strong evidence for ancient magnetism on Mars. It has been suggested that the crust was pulled apart here, as on plate boundaries on the Earth. There are high levels of potassium in the area which may point to a deep mantle source for volcanism or major changes in the crust.

Later research with CRISM found thick deposits, greater than 400 meters thick, that contained the minerals saponite, talc-saponite, Fe-rich mica (for example, glauconite-nontronite), Fe- and Mg-serpentine, Mg-Fe-Ca-carbonate and probable Fe-sulphide. The Fe-sulphide probably formed in deep water from water heated by volcanoes. Analyses from the Mars Reconnaissance Orbiter provided evidence of ancient hydrothermal seafloor deposits in Eridania basin, suggesting that hydrothermal vents pumped mineral-laden water directly into this ancient Martian lake. Some sources say clay deposits can be up to 2 km thick.

== Latitude dependent mantle ==
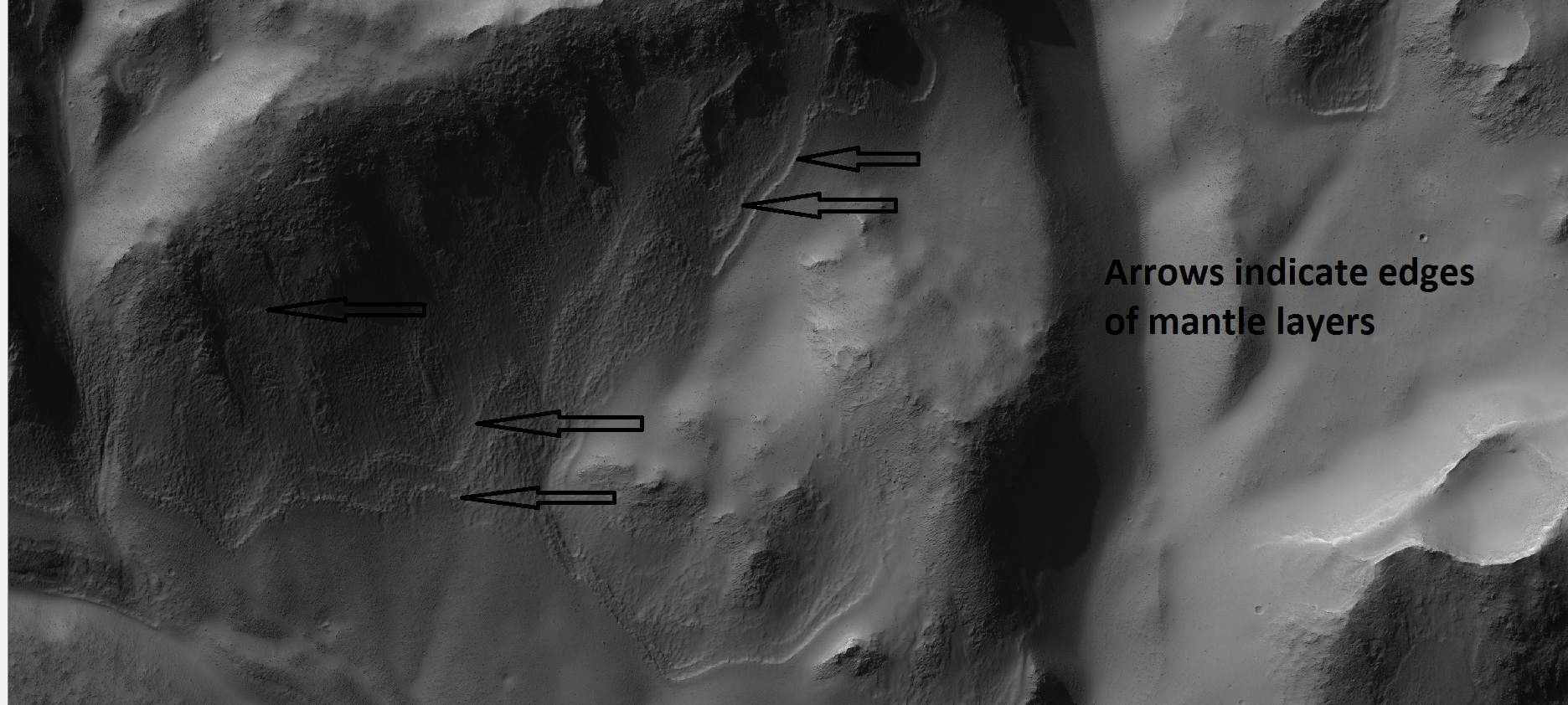
Mantle layers, as seen by HiRISE under HiWish program

Much of the Martian surface is covered with a thick ice-rich, mantle layer that has fallen from the sky a number of times in the past. In some places a number of layers are visible in the mantle. Some surfaces in Eridania are covered with this ice-rich mantling unit. In some places the surface displays a pitted or dissected texture; these textures are suggestive of material that once held ice that has since disappeared allowing the remaining soil to collapse into the subsurface.

== Channels ==
There is enormous evidence that water once flowed in river valleys on Mars. Images of curved channels have been seen in images from Mars spacecraft dating back to the early 1970s with the Mariner 9 orbiter. Indeed, a study published in June 2017, calculated that the volume of water needed to carve all the channels on Mars was even larger than the proposed ocean that the planet may have had. Water was probably recycled many times from the ocean to rainfall around Mars.

== See also ==
- Barchan
- Dust devil tracks
- Eridania Lake
- Eridania Planitia
- Glaciers
- Glaciers on Mars
- HiRISE
- Latitude dependent mantle
- Lakes on Mars
- Martian Gullies
- MOC Public Targeting Program

MC-01 Mare Boreum (features)
MC-02 Diacria (features)		MC-03 Arcadia (features)	MC-04 Acidalium (features)	MC-05 Ismenius Lacus (features)		MC-06 Casius (features)	MC-07 Cebrenia (features)
MC-08 Amazonis (features)	MC-09 Tharsis (features)	MC-10 Lunae Palus (features)	MC-11 Oxia Palus (features)	MC-12 Arabia (features)	MC-13 Syrtis Major (features)	MC-14 Amenthes (features)	MC-15 Elysium (features)
MC-16 Memnonia (features)	MC-17 Phoenicis Lacus (features)	MC-18 Coprates (features)	MC-19 Margaritifer Sinus (features)	MC-20 Sinus Sabaeus (features)	MC-21 Iapygia (features)	MC-22 Mare Tyrrhenum (features)	MC-23 Aeolis (features)
MC-24 Phaethontis (features)		MC-25 Thaumasia (features)	MC-26 Argyre (features)	MC-27 Noachis (features)		MC-28 Hellas (features)	MC-29 Eridania (features)
MC-30 Mare Australe (features)
