= Terra Cimmeria =

Terra on Mars

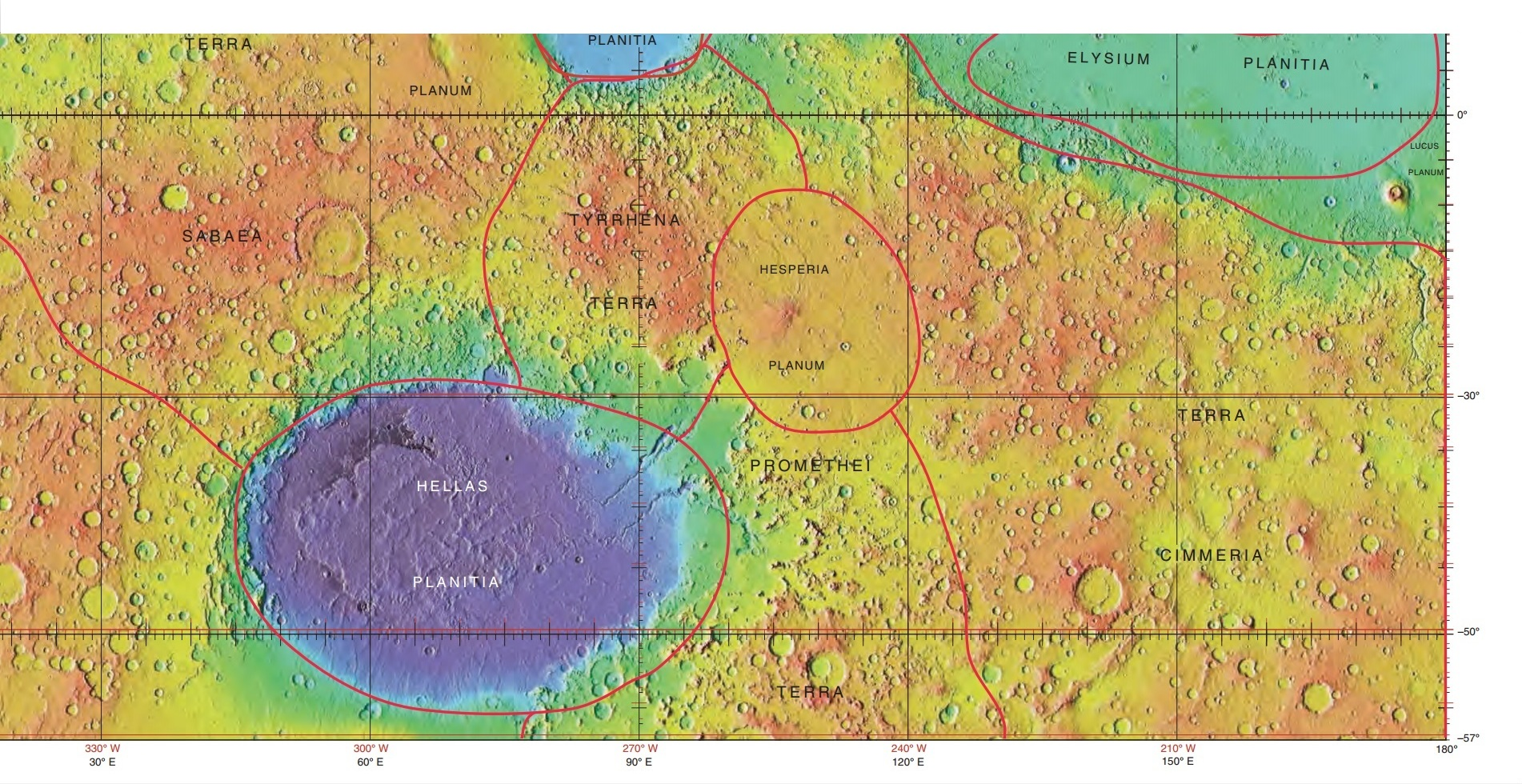
MOLA map showing boundaries of Terra Cimmeria and other nearby regions

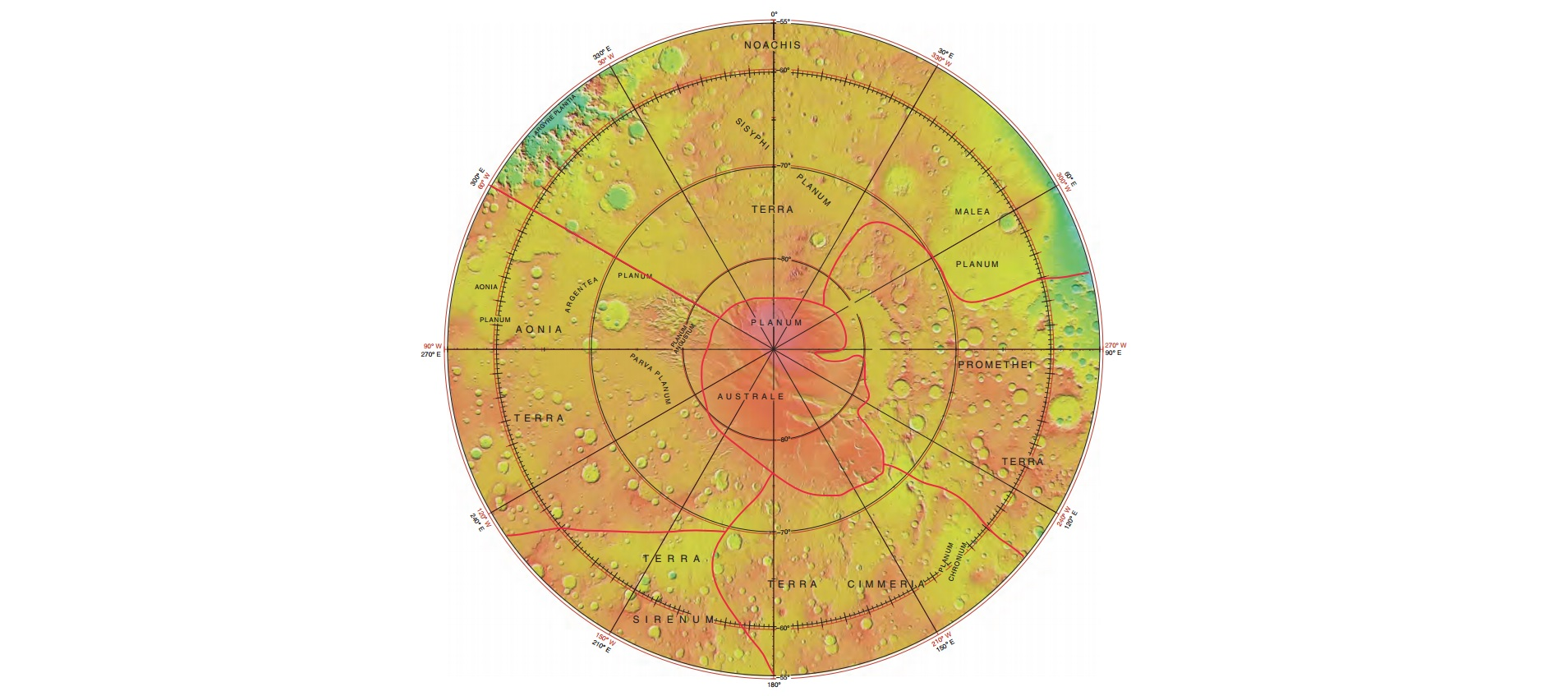
MOLA map showing boundaries of Terra Cimmeria near the south pole and other regions

Terra Cimmeria is a large Martian region, centered at 34.7°S 145°E and covering 5,400 km (3,400 mi) at its broadest extent. It covers latitudes 15 N to 75 S and longitudes 170 to 260 W. It lies in the Eridania quadrangle. Terra Cimmeria is one part of the heavily cratered, southern highland region of the planet. The Spirit rover landed near the area.

The word Cimmerium comes from an ancient Thracian seafaring people. The land was always covered in clouds and mist.

A high altitude visual phenomena, probably a condensation cloud, was seen above this region in late March 2012. NASA tried to observe it with some of its Mars orbiters, including the THEMIS instrument on the 2001 Mars Odyssey spacecraft and MARCI on the Mars Reconnaissance Orbiter.

== Martian gullies ==
Terra Cimmeria is the location of gullies that may be due to recent flowing water. Gullies occur on steep slopes, especially on the walls of craters. Gullies are believed to be relatively young because they have few if any craters. Moreover, they lie on top of sand dunes which themselves are considered to be quite young. Usually, each gully has an alcove, channel, and apron. Some studies have found that gullies occur on slopes that face all directions, others have found that the greater number of gullies are found on poleward facing slopes, especially from 30–44 S.

Although many ideas have been put forward to explain them, the most popular involve liquid water coming from an aquifer, from melting at the base of old glaciers, or from the melting of ice in the ground when the climate was warmer.

There is evidence for all three theories. Most of the gully alcove heads occur at the same level, just as one would expect of an aquifer. Various measurements and calculations show that liquid water could exist in aquifers at the usual depths where gullies begin. One variation of this model is that rising hot magma could have melted ice in the ground and caused water to flow in aquifers. Aquifers are layers that allow water to flow. They may consist of porous sandstone. The aquifer layer would be perched on top of another layer that prevents water from going down (in geological terms it would be called impermeable). Because water in an aquifer is prevented from going down, the only direction the trapped water can flow is horizontally. Eventually, water could flow out onto the surface when the aquifer reaches a break—like a crater wall. The resulting flow of water could erode the wall to create gullies. Aquifers are quite common on Earth. A good example is "Weeping Rock" in Zion National Park Utah.

As for the next theory, much of the surface of Mars is covered by a thick smooth mantle that is thought to be a mixture of ice and dust. This ice-rich mantle, a few yards thick, smooths the land, but in places it has a bumpy texture, resembling the surface of a basketball. The mantle may be like a glacier and under certain conditions the ice that is mixed in the mantle could melt and flow down the slopes and make gullies. Because there are few craters on this mantle, the mantle is relatively young. An excellent view of this mantle is shown below in the picture of the Ptolemaeus Crater Rim, as seen by HiRISE. The ice-rich mantle may be the result of climate changes. Changes in Mars's orbit and tilt cause significant changes in the distribution of water ice from polar regions down to latitudes equivalent to Texas. During certain climate periods water vapor leaves polar ice and enters the atmosphere. The water comes back to ground at lower latitudes as deposits of frost or snow mixed generously with dust. The atmosphere of Mars contains a great deal of fine dust particles. Water vapor will condense on the particles, then fall down to the ground due to the additional weight of the water coating. When Mars is at its greatest tilt or obliquity, up to 2 cm (0.79 in) of ice could be removed from the summer ice cap and deposited at midlatitudes. This movement of water could last for several thousand years and create a snow layer of up to around 10 m (33 ft) thick. When ice at the top of the mantling layer goes back into the atmosphere, it leaves behind dust, which insulates the remaining ice. Measurements of altitudes and slopes of gullies support the idea that snowpacks or glaciers are associated with gullies. Steeper slopes have more shade which would preserve snow. Higher elevations have far fewer gullies because ice would tend to sublimate more in the thin air of the higher altitude.

The third theory might be possible since climate changes may be enough to simply allow ice in the ground to melt and thus form the gullies. During a warmer climate, the first few meters of ground could thaw and produce a "debris flow" similar to those on the dry and cold Greenland east coast. Since the gullies occur on steep slopes only a small decrease of the shear strength of the soil particles is needed to begin the flow. Small amounts of liquid water from melted ground ice could be enough. Calculations show that a third of a mm of runoff can be produced each day for 50 days of each Martian year, even under current conditions.

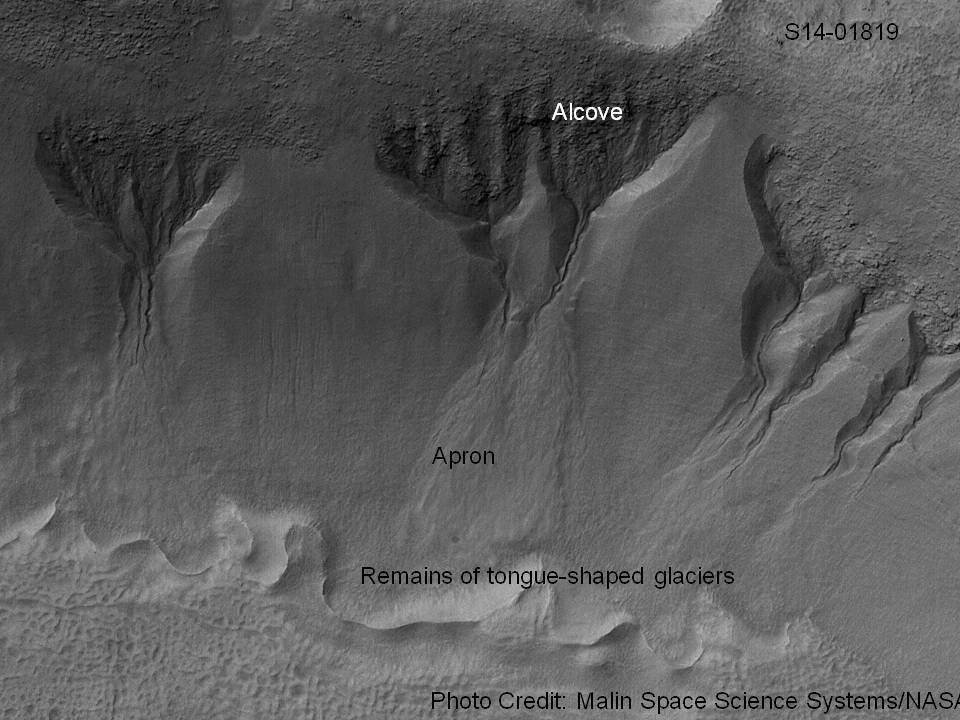
Group of gullies near Newton crater (41.3047°S 192.89°E) (Mars Global Surveyor).

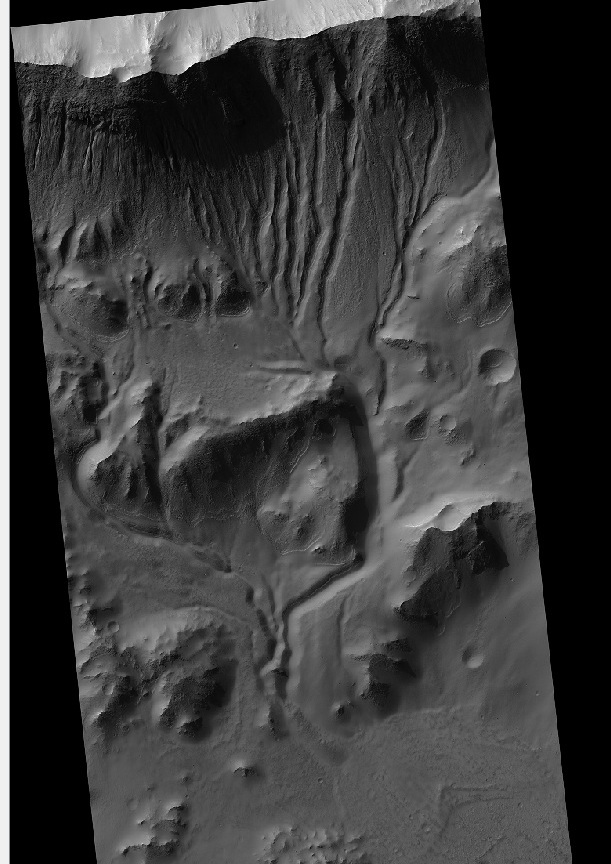
Gullies (HiRISE).

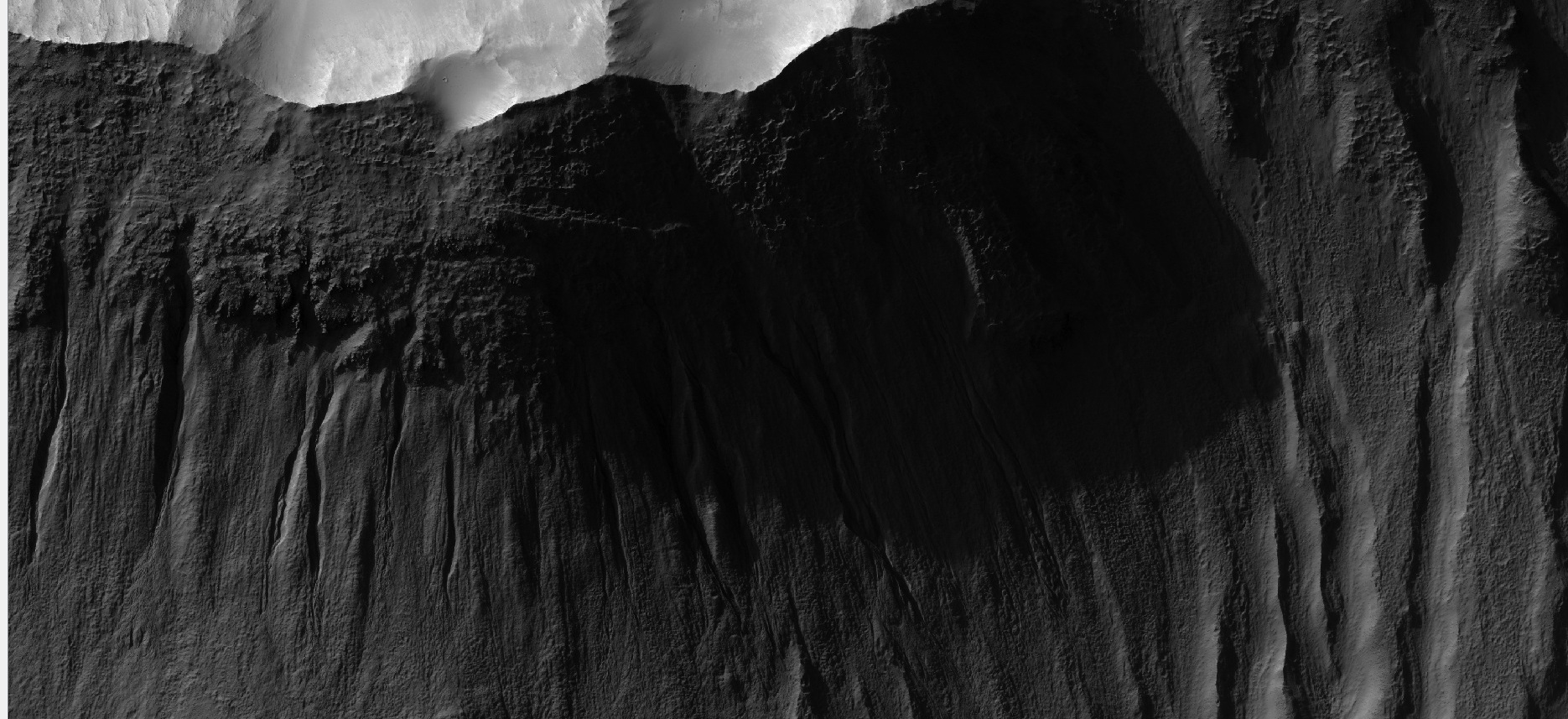
Gullies - Close-up (HiRISE).

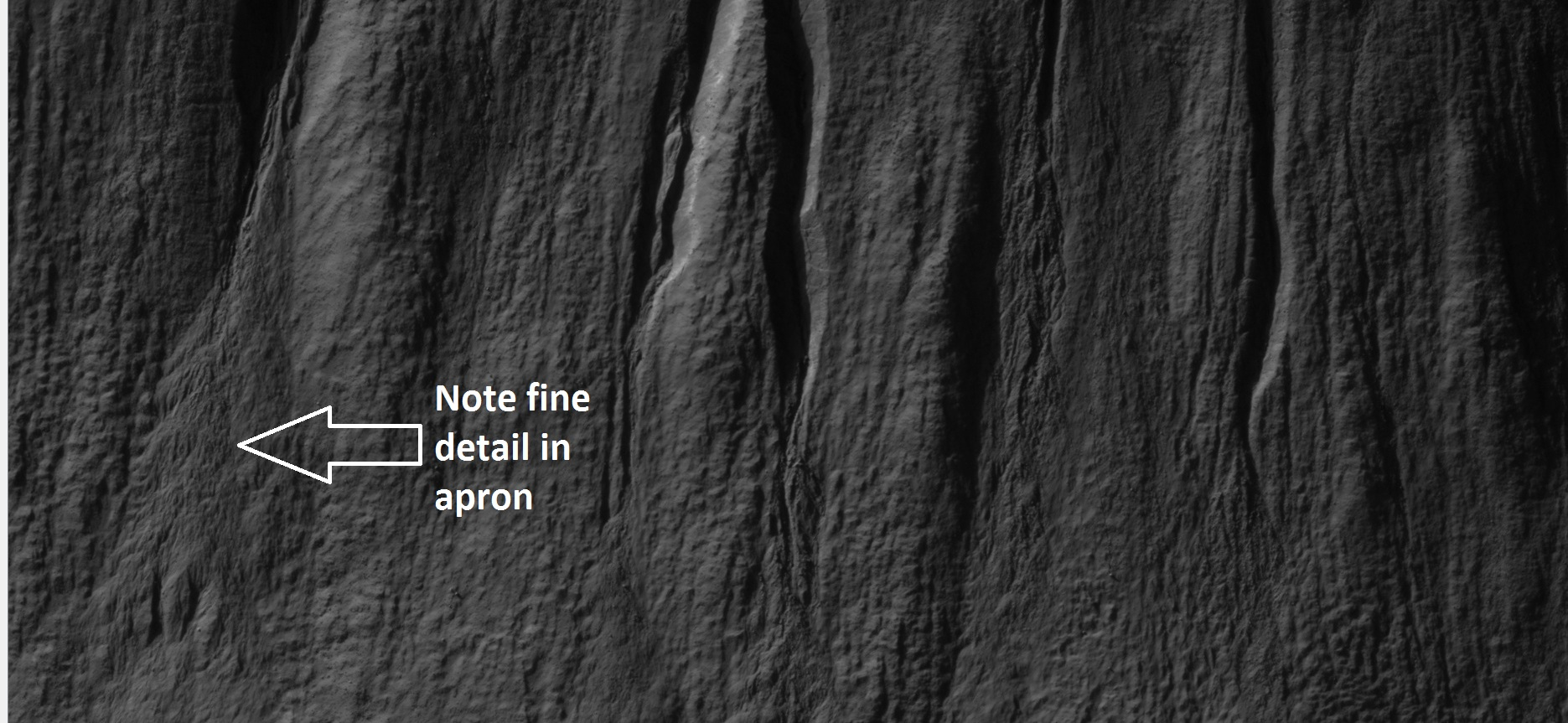
Gullies apron - Close-up (HiRISE).

== Magnetic stripes and plate tectonics ==
The Mars Global Surveyor (MGS) discovered magnetic stripes in the crust of Mars, especially in the Phaethontis and Eridania quadrangles (Terra Cimmeria and Terra Sirenum). The magnetometer on MGS discovered 100 km (62 mi) wide stripes of magnetized crust running roughly parallel for up to 2,000 kilometres (1,200 mi). These stripes alternate in polarity with the north magnetic pole of one pointing up from the surface and the north magnetic pole of the next pointing down. When similar stripes were discovered on Earth in the 1960s, they were taken as evidence of plate tectonics. Researchers believe these magnetic stripes on Mars are evidence for a short, early period of plate tectonic activity. When the rocks became solid they retained the magnetism that existed at the time. A magnetic field of a planet is believed to be caused by fluid motions under the surface. The initial data was obtained when MGS traveled close to the planet during aerobraking. However, later measurements, collected over a 2-year period from an altitude of 400 km (250 mi), revealed that the magnetic features even matched up with known features on the surface. However, there are some differences, between the magnetic stripes on Earth and those on Mars. The Martian stripes are wider, much more strongly magnetized, and do not appear to spread out from a middle crustal spreading zone. Because the area containing the magnetic stripes is around four billion years old, it is believed that the global magnetic field probably lasted for only the first few hundred million years of Mars' life, when the temperature of the molten iron in the planet's core might have been high enough to mix it into a magnetic dynamo. There are no magnetic fields near large impact basins like Hellas. The shock of the impact may have erased the remnant magnetization in the rock. Magnetism produced by early fluid motion in the core would not have existed after the impacts.

When molten rock containing magnetic material, such as hematite (Fe_{2}O_{3}), cools and solidifies in the presence of a magnetic field, it becomes magnetized and takes on the polarity of the background field. This magnetism is lost only if the rock is subsequently heated above a particular temperature (the Curie point which is 770 °C for iron). The magnetism left in rocks is a record of the magnetic field when the rock solidified.

== Glaciers ==
Many features on Mars are believed to be glaciers with a relatively thin coating of debris that keeps the ice from melting. Some of these features are shown in the pictures below. A detailed description of them can be found in the article Glaciers on Mars.

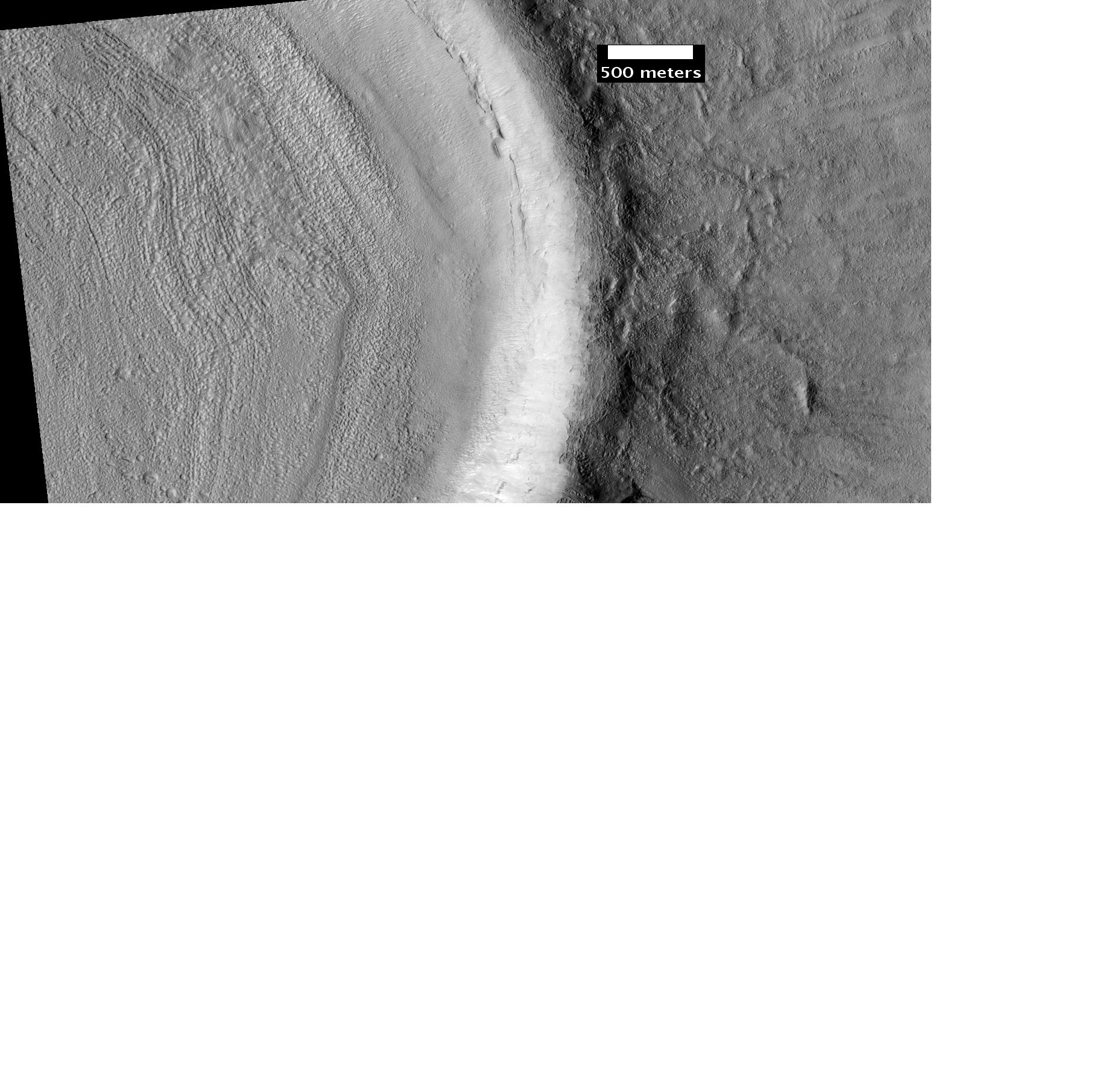
Crater floor, as seen by HiRISE under HiWish program. Rough surface was produced by ice leaving the ground. The crater has accumulated much ice that is covered by rocks and dirt.

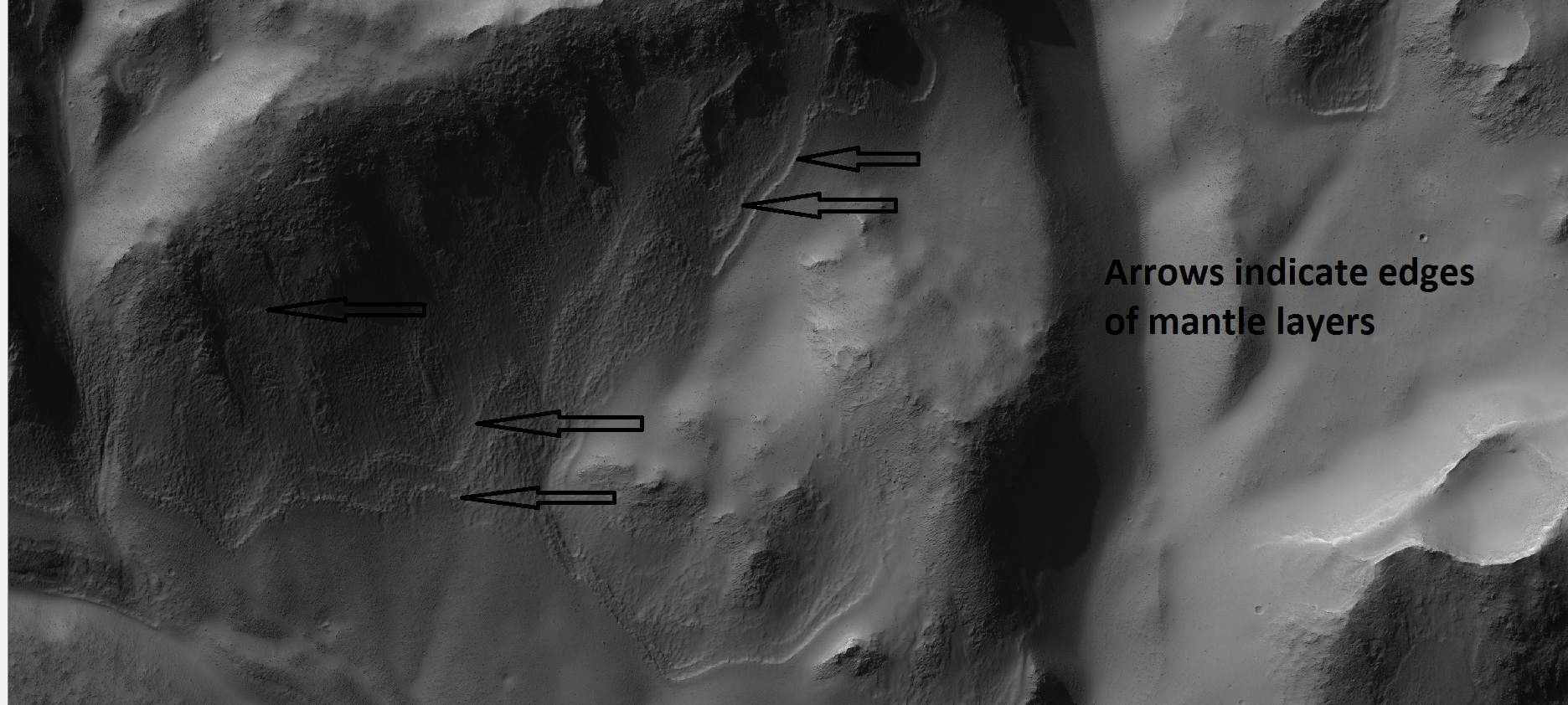
Mantle layers, as seen by HiRISE under HiWish program. Mantle is ice-rich and falls from the sky during certain climates. The presence of a number of layers suggests it has come from the sky at different times.

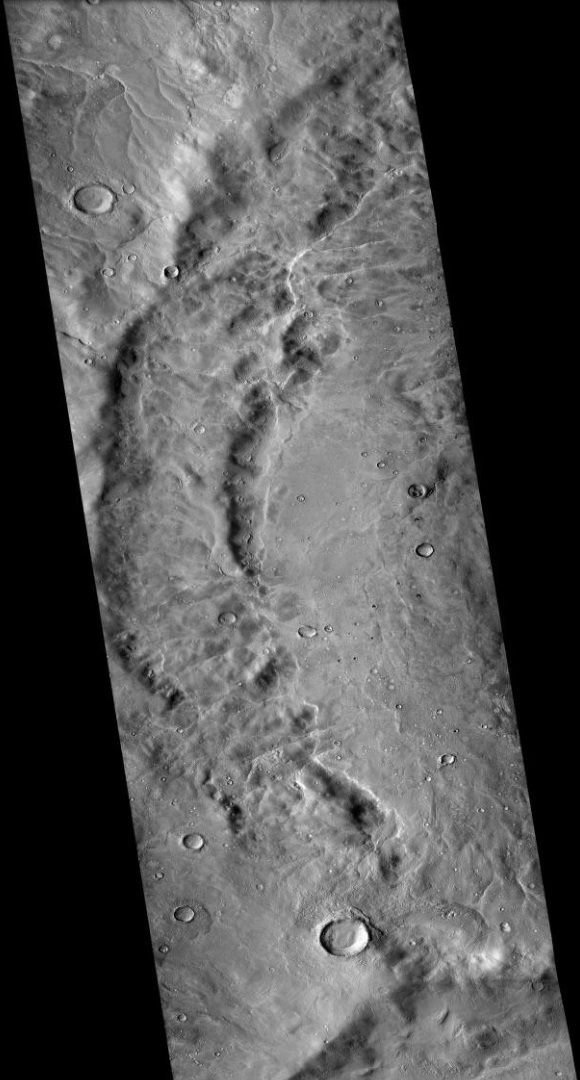
Arrhenius Crater, as seen by CTX camera (on Mars Reconnaissance Orbiter).

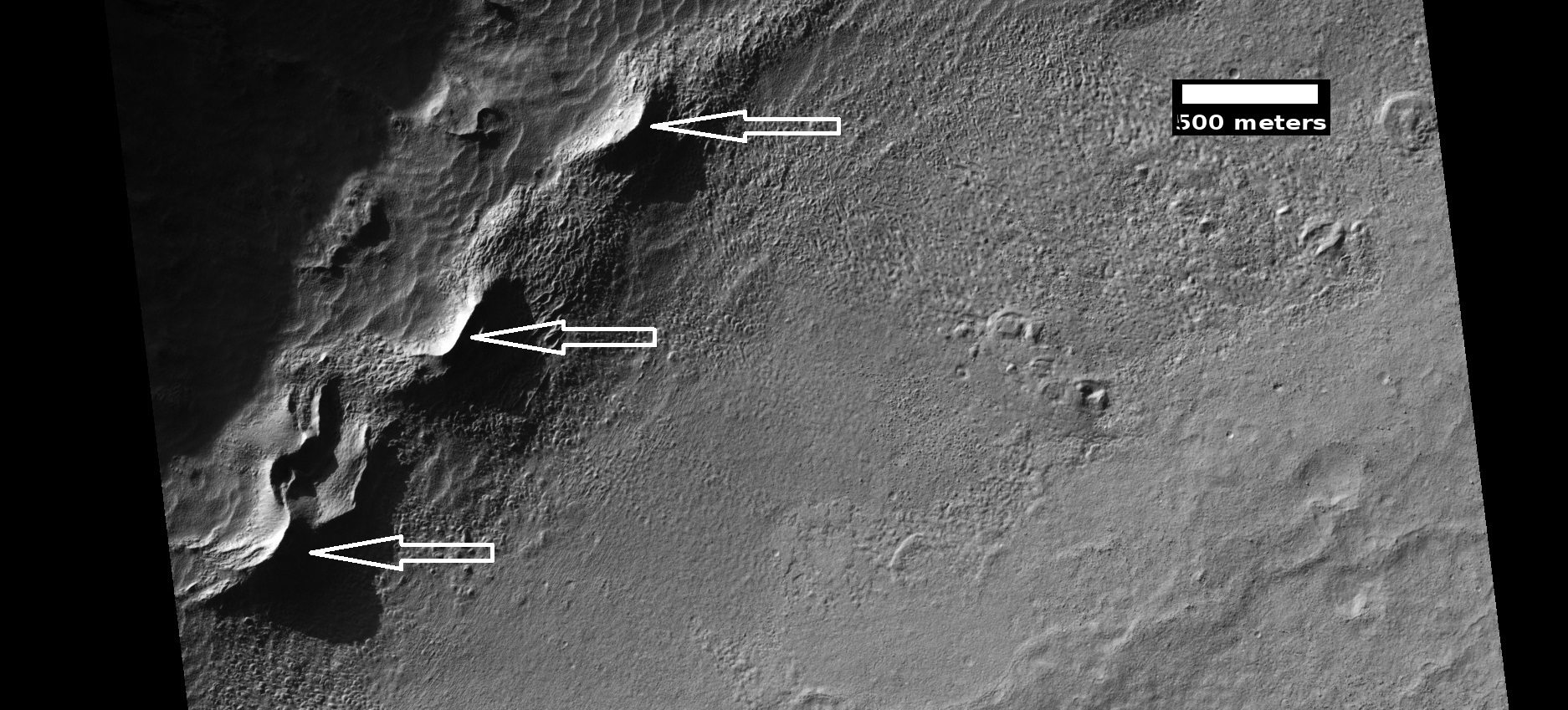
Glacial features in Arrhenius Crater, as seen by HiRISE under the HiWish program. Arrows point to old glaciers.

== Dunes ==
When there are perfect conditions for producing sand dunes, steady wind in one direction and just enough sand, a barchan sand dune forms. Barchans have a gentle slope on the wind side and a much steeper slope on the lee side where horns or a notch often forms. The whole dune may appear to move with the wind. Observing dunes on Mars can tell us how strong the winds are, as well as their direction.If pictures are taken at regular intervals, one may see changes in the dunes or possibly in ripples on the dune's surface. On Mars, dunes are often dark in color because they were formed from the common, volcanic rock basalt. In the dry environment, dark minerals in basalt, like olivine and pyroxene, do not break down as they do on Earth. Although rare, some dark sand is found on Hawaii which also has many volcanoes discharging basalt. Barchan is a Russian term because this type of dune was first seen in the desert regions of Turkistan. Some of the wind on Mars is created when the dry ice at the poles is heated in the spring. At that time, the solid carbon dioxide (dry ice) sublimates or changes directly to a gas and rushes away at high speeds. Each Martian year 30% of the carbon dioxide in the atmosphere freezes out and covers the pole that is experiencing winter, so there is a great potential for strong winds.

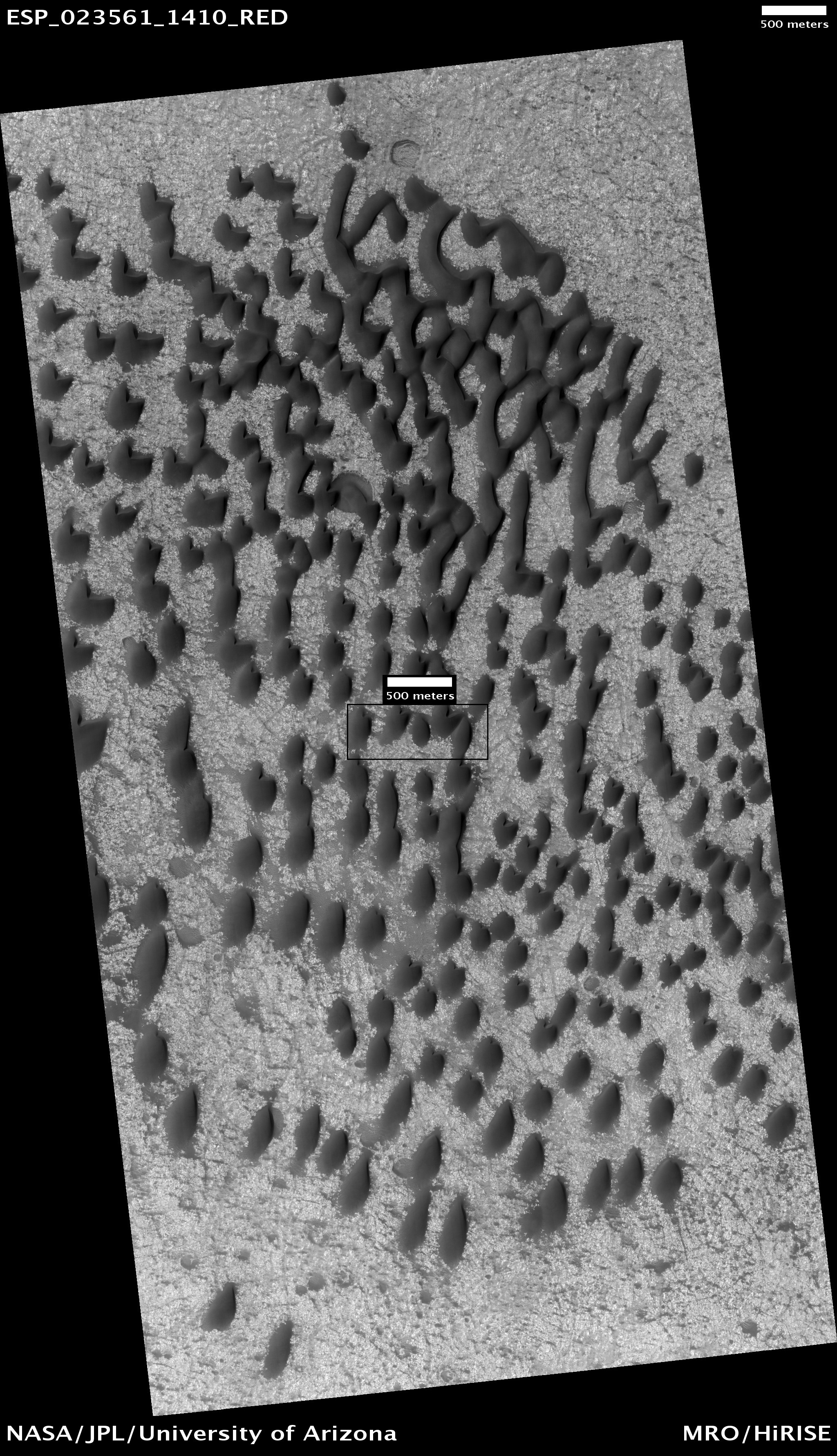
Dark dunes, as seen by HiRISE under HiWish program. Dark dunes are composed of the igneous rock basalt. The dark box in the center of the photo shows the area enlarged in the next image. The scale is 500 meters long.

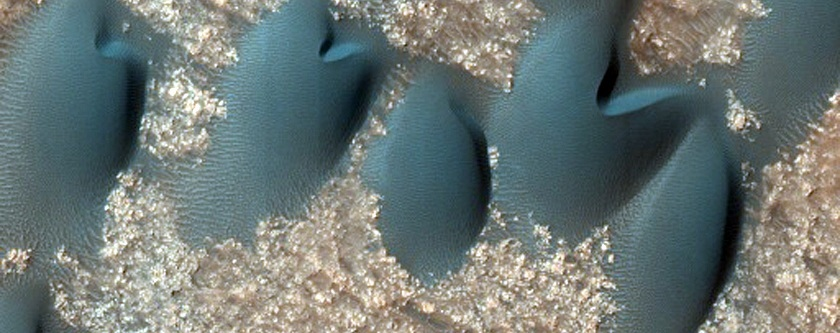
Close up of dark dunes, as seen by HiRISE under HiWish program. The image is a little more than 1 km in its longest dimension. The location of this image is shown in the previous image.

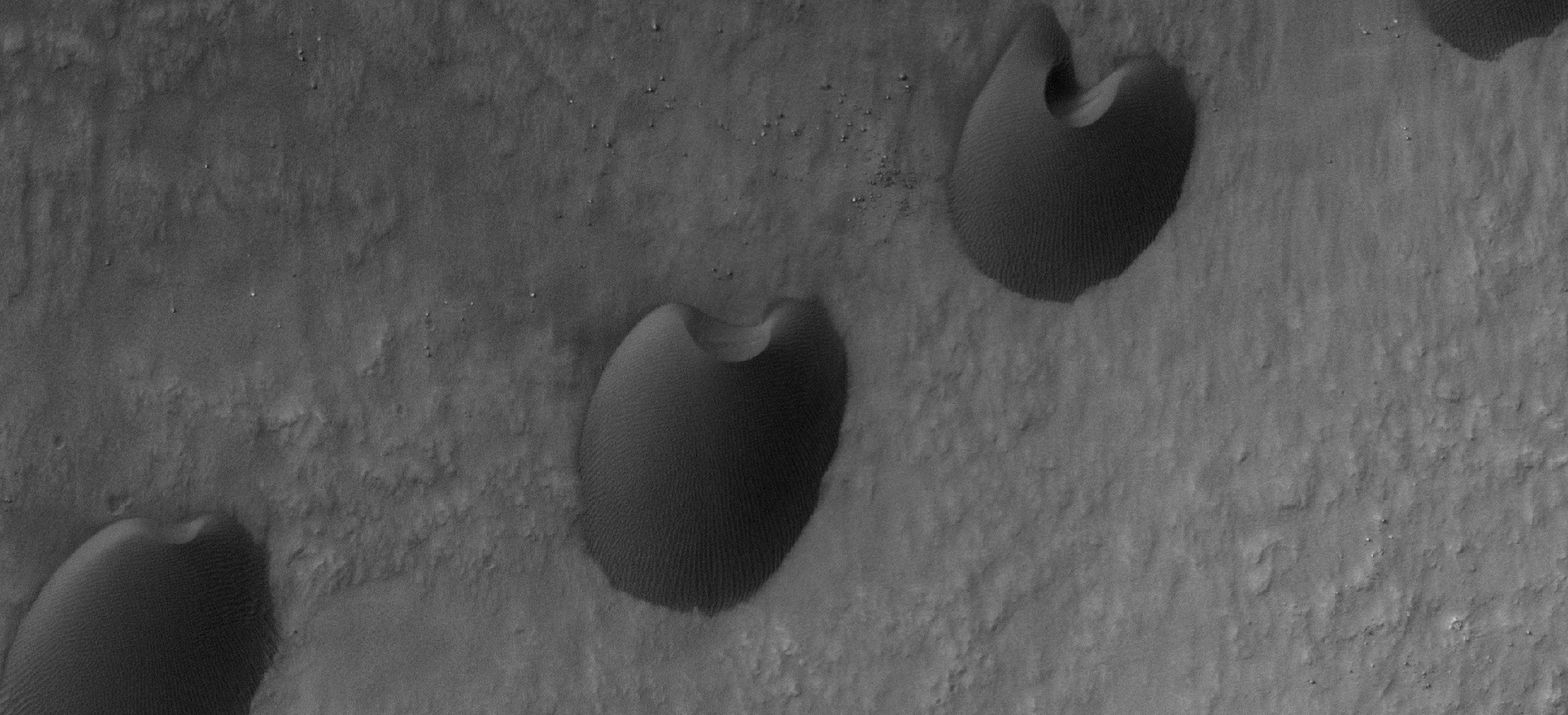
Dunes, as seen by HiRISE under HiWish program. Location is Eridania quadrangle.

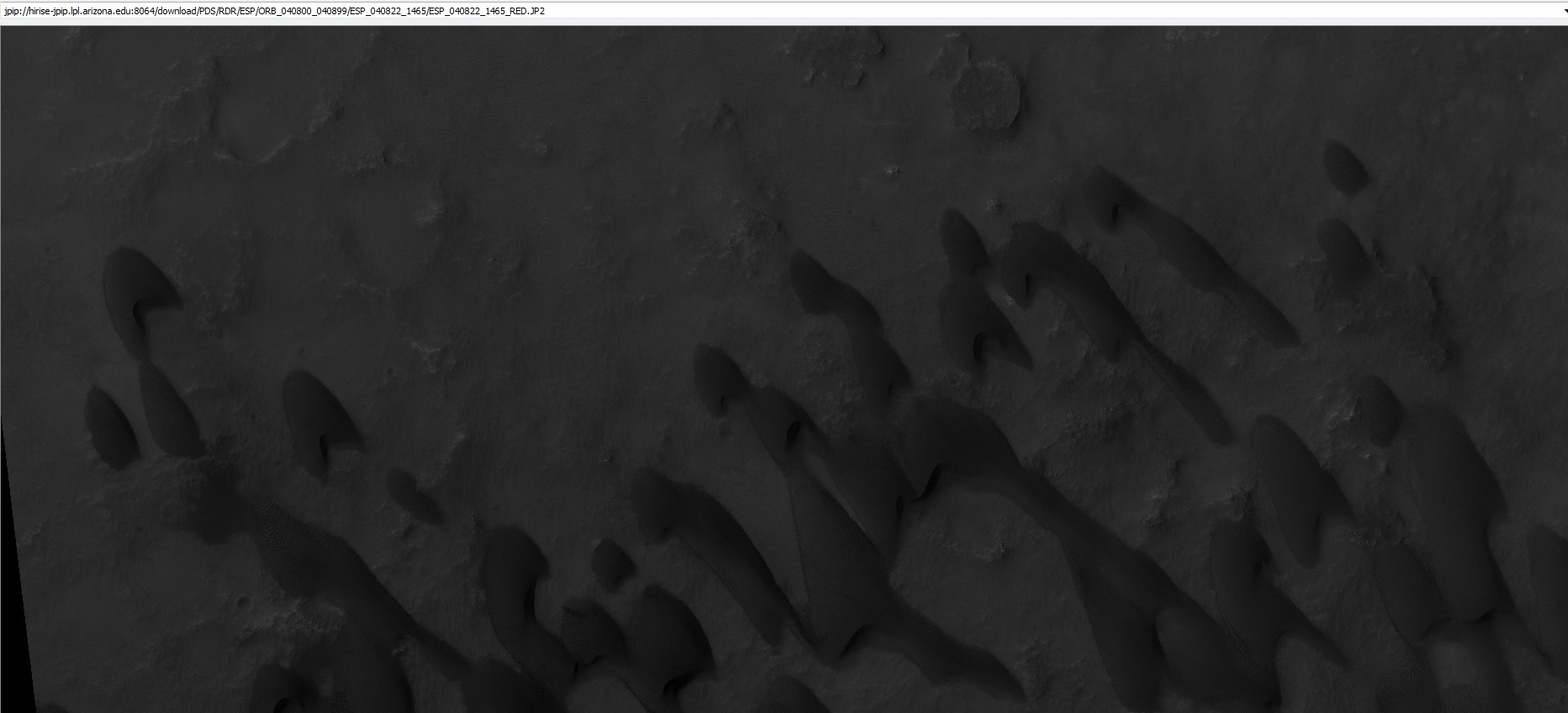
Dunes on crater floor, as seen by HiRISE under HiWish progr

== See also ==
- Barchan
- Geography of Mars
- Glaciers on Mars
- Martian Gullies
- Water on Mars
