= Eridania Lake =

Proposed ancient lake on Mars

Eridania Lake is a hypothesized ancient lake on Mars with a surface area of roughly 1.1 million square kilometers. It is located at the source of the Maʼadim Vallis outflow channel and extends into Eridania quadrangle and the Phaethontis quadrangle. As Eridania Lake dried out in the late Noachian epoch, it divided into a series of smaller lakes.

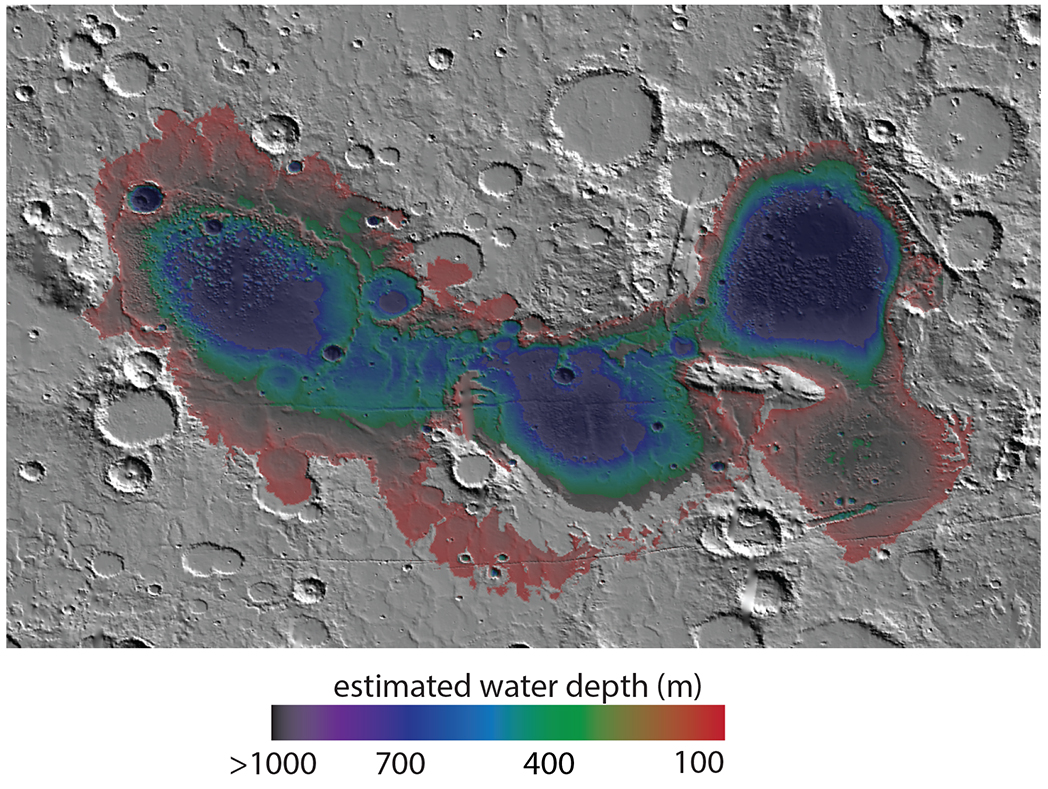
Map showing estimated water depth in different parts of Eridania Sea. This map is about 850 km (530 miles) across.

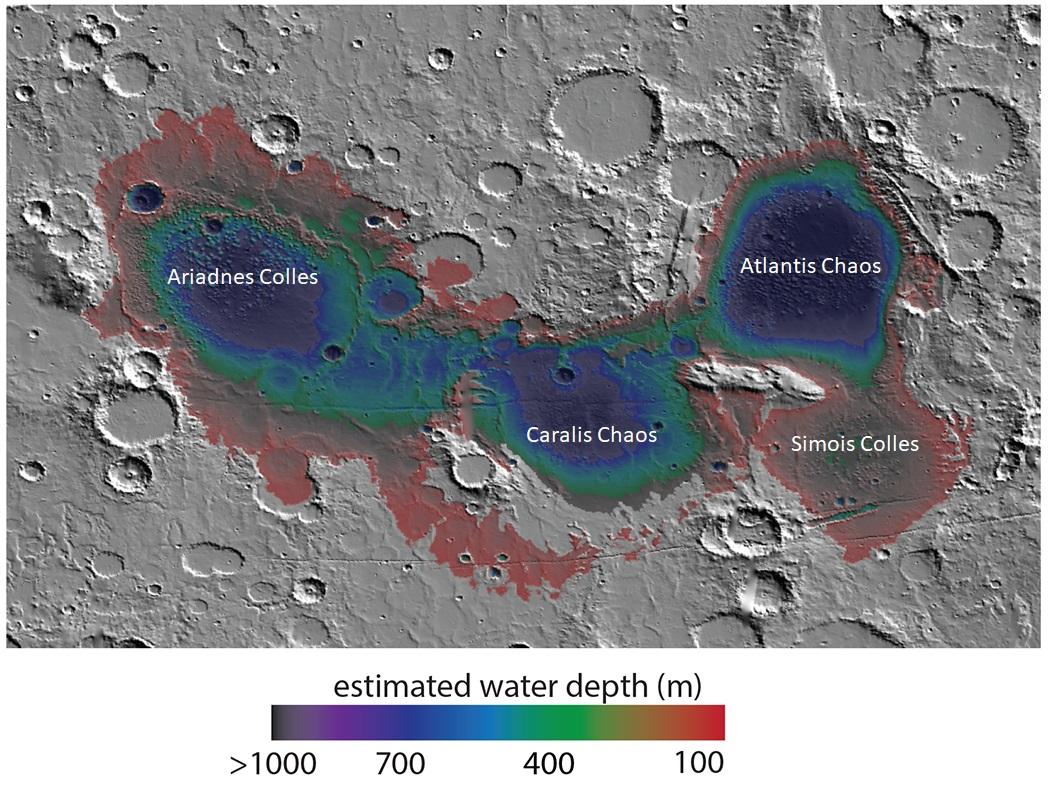
Features around Eridania Sea labeled

== Makeup ==
Later research with CRISM found thick deposits, greater than 400 meters thick, that contained the minerals saponite, talc-saponite, Fe-rich mica (for example, glauconite-nontronite), Fe- and Mg-serpentine, Mg-Fe-Ca-carbonate and probable Fe-sulphide. The Fe-sulphide probably formed in deep water from water heated by volcanoes. Such a process, classified as hydrothermal may have been a place where life began. Some sources say clay deposits can be up to 2 km thick.

The Eridania lake shows an assumed shoreline seeing all the depressions that are all connected which is why this might have been a huge lake in ancient times. The Eridania lake is supposed to be one of the largest lake systems on Mars at a point in time. The lake is part of the Ariadnes Basin, and its coastline is approximately 900 meters above the Mars Datum. Fe/Mg-rich smectite clays and other phyllosilicate deposits have been detected in this area.

The Eridania lake drained into the Maʼadim valleys turning into isolated closed lakes. By looking at the thickness of the sediments in these closed lakes we can see that they may have lasted for a long period of time. Some observations continue to point toward a lake and catastrophic drainage such as the presence of valley networks terminating at the elevation of the Maʼadim Valles.

The Eridania lake is believed to have had at least 562,000 km^{3} of water, and there was a breach in the Eridania paleolake system which created the Maʼadim valleys which was forced by a catastrophic flood.

== Gallery ==
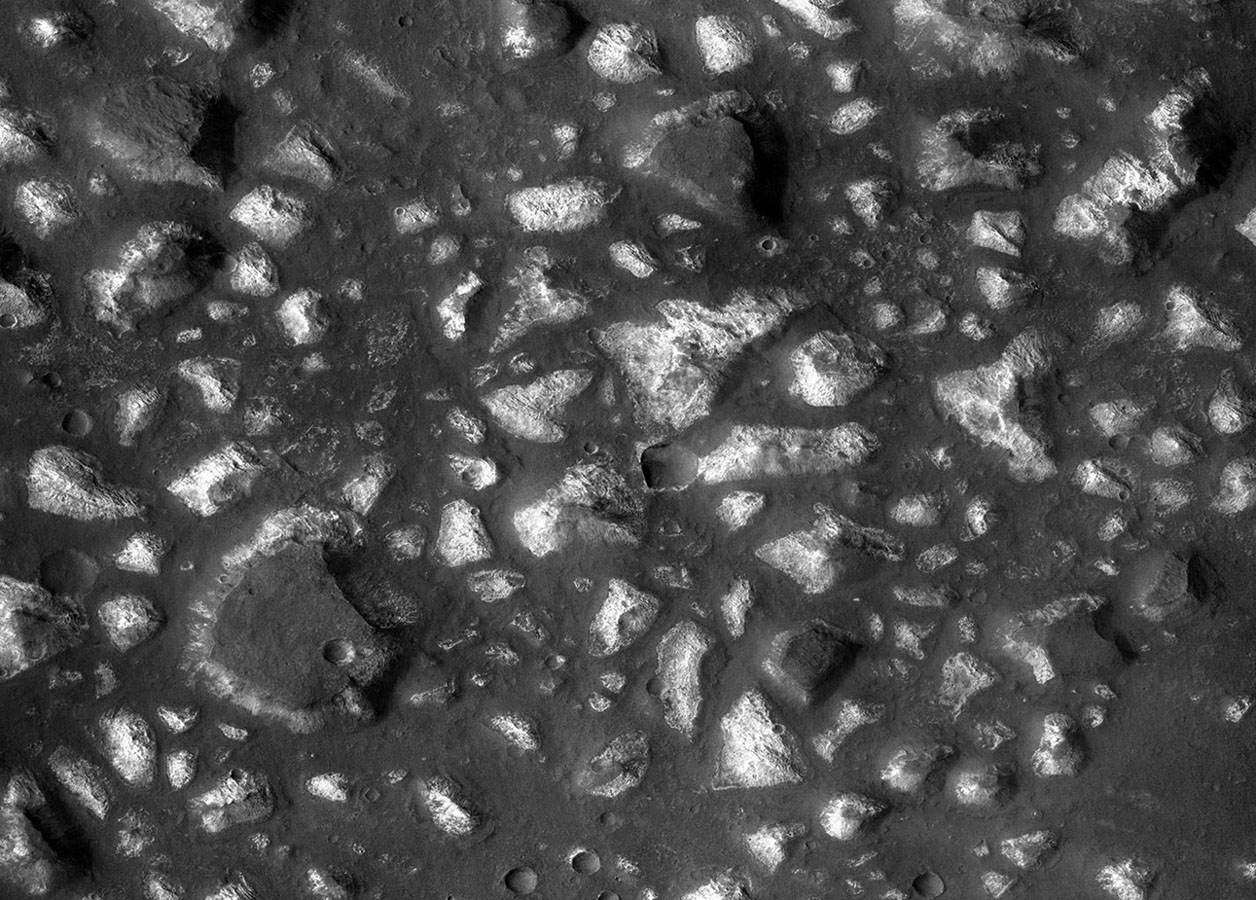
Deep-basin deposits from the floor of Eridania Sea. The mesas on the floor are there because they were protected against intense erosion by deep water/ice cover. CRISM measurements show minerals may be from seafloor hydrothermal deposits. Life may have originated in this sea.

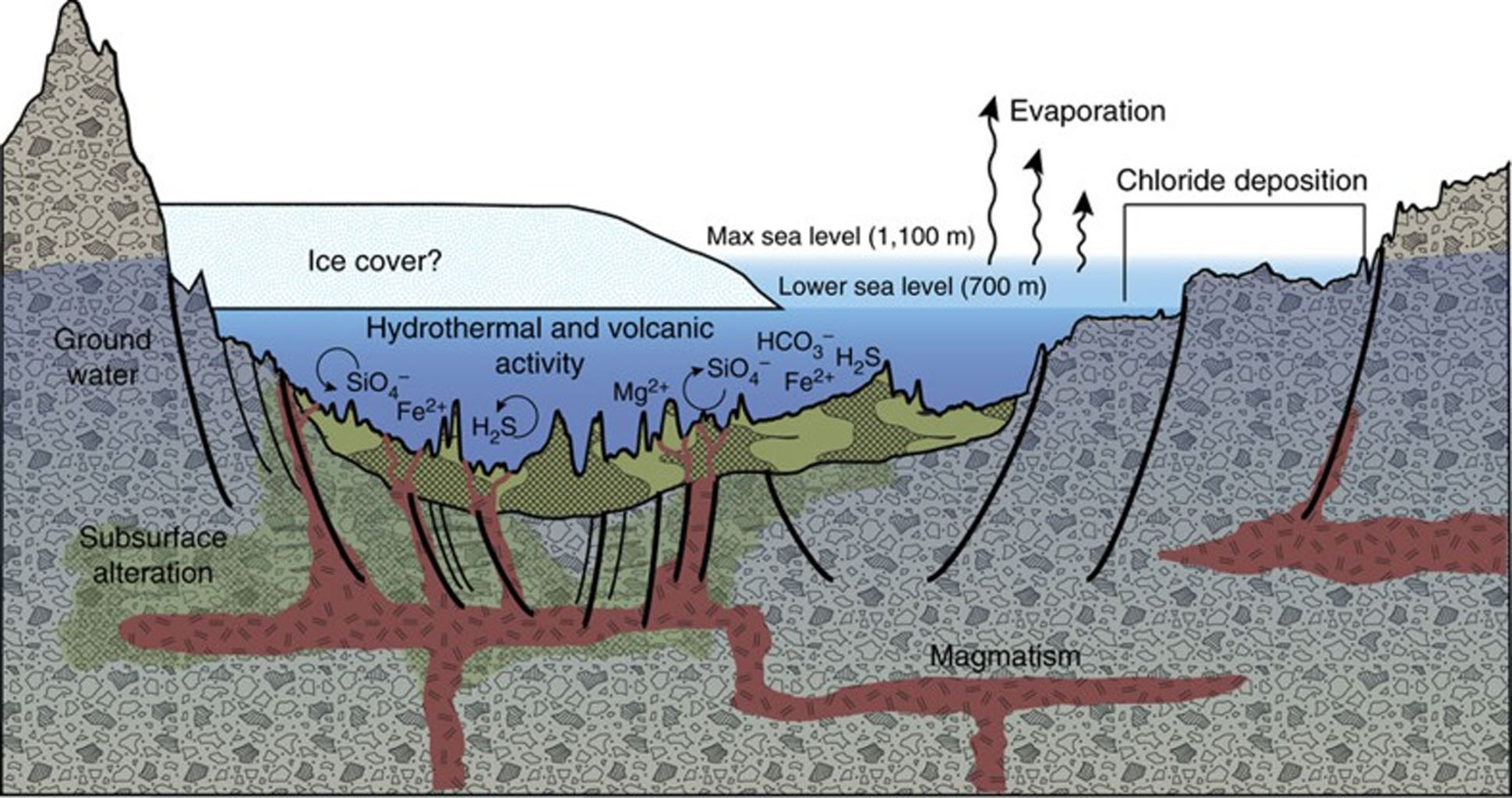
Diagram showing how volcanic activity may have caused deposition of minerals on floor of Eridania Sea. Chlorides were deposited along the shoreline by evaporation.

== See also ==
- CRISM
- Eridania quadrangle
- Lakes on Mars
- Water on Mars
