= Maʼadim Vallis =

Vallis on Mars

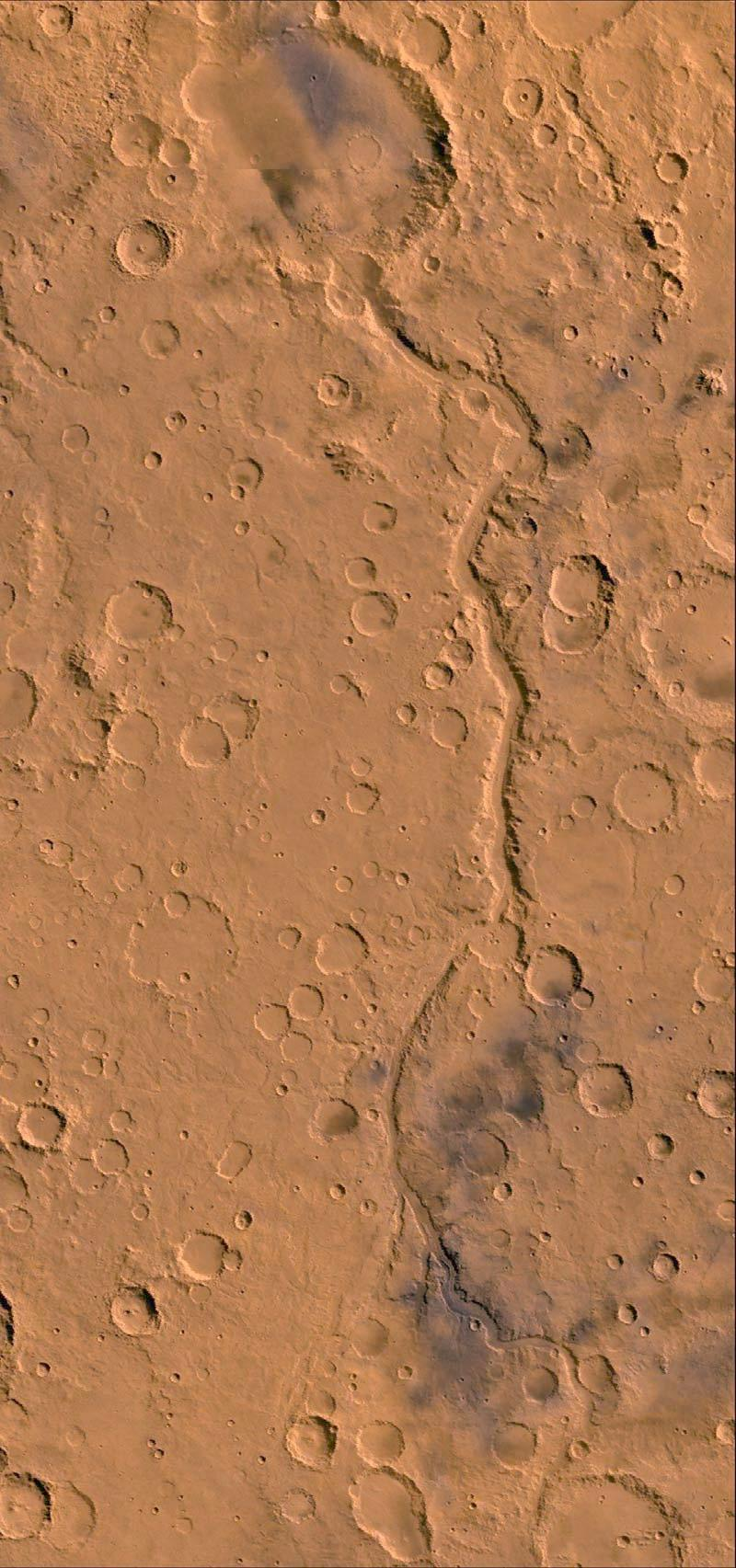
- Viking orbiter view of Maʼadim Vallis, with Gusev Crater outlet at top
- Coordinates: 21.8°S 182.7°W
- Length: 825 km
- Naming: Word for "Mars" in Hebrew

Maʼadim Vallis is one of the largest outflow channels on Mars, about 700 km long and significantly larger than Earth's Grand Canyon. It is over 20 km wide and 2 km deep in some places. It runs from a region of southern lowlands thought to have once contained a large group of lakes (see Eridania Lake) north to Gusev crater near the equator. It looks as if water may have collected in Gusev crater, forming a giant lake; the Spirit Rover was sent there to investigate that possibility, but found only volcanic rocks on the floor of Gusev. Any lake deposits were probably covered over by a later deposit of volcanic materials from Apollinaris Mons, a nearby volcano.

Maʼadim Vallis is in the Aeolis quadrangle.

Maʼadim Vallis is thought to have been carved by flowing water early in Mars' history. Some of the short narrow channels along the walls of Maʼadim are probably sapping channels. Sapping occurs when groundwater partially dissolves and undermines the rock, which collapses into debris deposits and is carried away by other erosion processes.

Maʼadim (מאדים) is the Hebrew name of the Planet Mars.

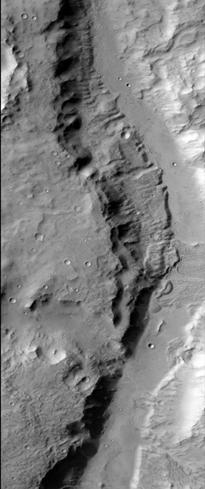
Section of Maʼadim Vallis as seen by HiRISE. A more recent flow of water may have formed the smaller, deeper channel to the right.

== See also ==
- Geography of Mars
- Geology of Mars
- HiRISE
- Lakes on Mars
- Vallis (planetary geology)
- Water on Mars
