= Ladon Valles =

River valley system on Mars

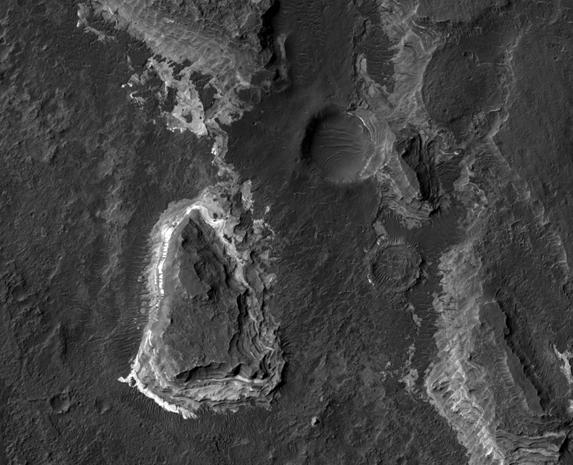
- The Ladon Valles as seen by HiRISE.
- Coordinates: 22.6°S 28.7°W
- Dimensions: 278 km long

The Ladon Valles are a river valley system lying within the Margaritifer Sinus quadrangle (MC-19) region of the planet Mars located at 22.6° South and 28.7° West. They are 278 km long and were named after an ancient name for a Greek river.

It has been argued that Uzboi, Ladon, Margaritifer and Ares valles, although now separated by large craters, once comprised a single outflow channel system flowing north into Chryse Planitia. The source of this outflow has been suggested as overflow from the Argyre crater, formerly filled to the brim as a lake by channels (Surius, Dzigai, and Palacopus valles) draining down from the south pole. If real, the full length of this drainage system would be over 8000 km, the longest known drainage path in the Solar System.

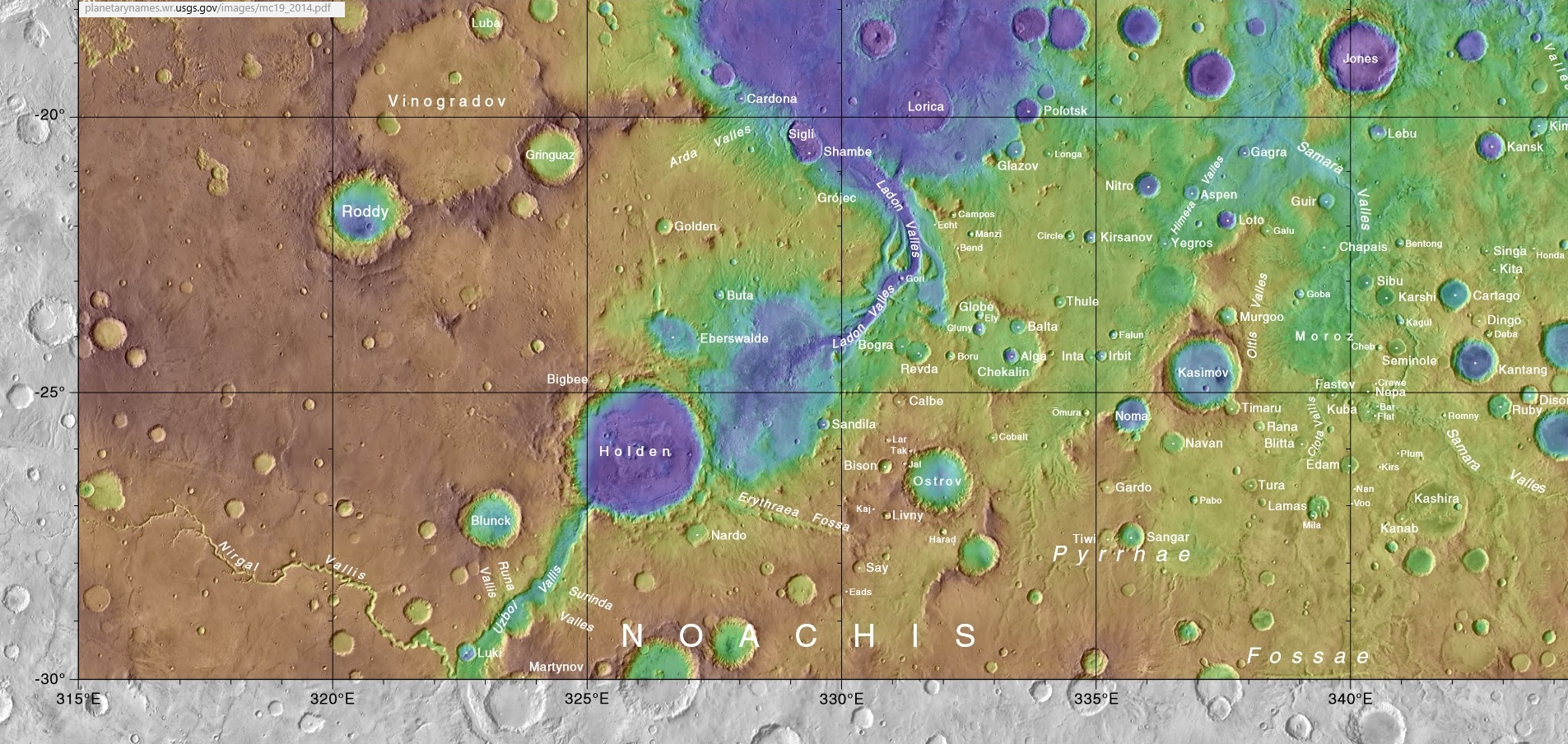
Map showing locations of the Ladon Valles and other nearby valleys

== See also ==
- Geology of Mars
- HiRISE
- Lakes on Mars
- Outflow channels
- Uzboi-Landon-Morava (ULM)
- Vallis (planetary geology)
- Water on Mars
