= Nirgal =

The name Nirgal can mean:

- Nergal, a god of war in the old Babylonian religion
- A character in the Mars trilogy by Kim Stanley Robinson
- Nirgal Vallis, a placename on Mars
