= Holden (Martian crater) =

Martian crater

- Crater Holden based on THEMIS day-time image
- Planet: Mars
- Coordinates: 26.4°S 34.0°W
- Quadrangle: Margaritifer Sinus
- Diameter: 153.8
- Eponym: Edward S. Holden

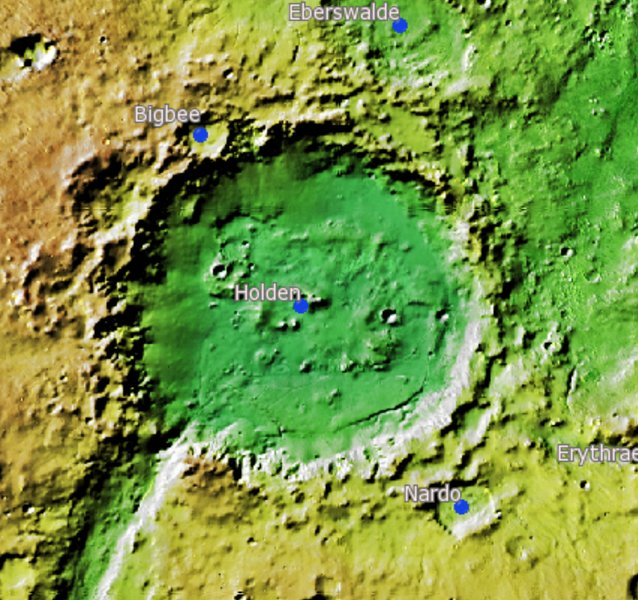
Topographic map of Holden Crater

Holden is a 140 km wide crater situated within the Margaritifer Sinus quadrangle (MC-19) region of the planet Mars, located with the southern highlands. It is named after American astronomer Edward Singleton Holden. It is part of the Uzboi-Landon-Morava (ULM) system.

== Description ==
Like Gusev, it is notable for an outlet channel, Uzboi Vallis, that runs into it, and for many features that seem to have been created by flowing water. It is believed that Holden crater was formed by an impact during the Noachian or Hesperian periods.

The crater's rim is cut with gullies, and at the end of some gullies are fan-shaped deposits of material transported by water. The crater is of great interest to scientists because it has some of the best-exposed lake deposits. One of the layers has been found by the Mars Reconnaissance Orbiter to contain clays.

Clays only form in the presence of water. There are two units of sediments in the crater. The lower unit formed in a large lake. It is believed the lake waters originated from the crater walls/or groundwater. Water from the crater walls may have come from precipitation when the Martian climate was different. The upper unit formed when water that was ponded to the south in Uzboi Vallis broke through Holden's rim. It is believed that great amount of water went through the rim; one flow was caused by a body of water larger than Earth's Lake Huron. Some of the evidence for such a large flow of water is the presence of boulders tens of meters in size sticking above the surface. To transport such huge rocks takes a great deal of water.

Holden is an old crater, containing numerous smaller craters, many of which are filled with sediment. The crater's central mountain is also obscured by sediment. Holden crater was a proposed landing site for NASA's Mars Science Laboratory, until Gale crater was deemed a better landing site. Just to the northeast of Holden is Eberswalde crater which contains a large delta. The lower beds of Holden are thought by some to maybe similar to materials in Eberswalde. However, Holden was considered a potential landing site for the Mars 2020 rover. In the second Mars 2020 Landing Site Workshop it survived the cut and was named to be among the top 8 sites in the running for the landing. Despite its promising features, Jezero Crater was ultimately chosen.

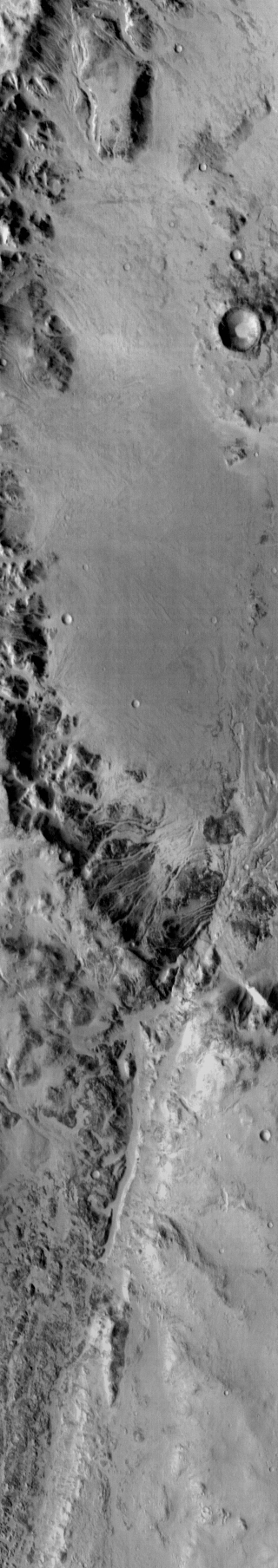
West rim of Holden crater, as seen by THEMIS

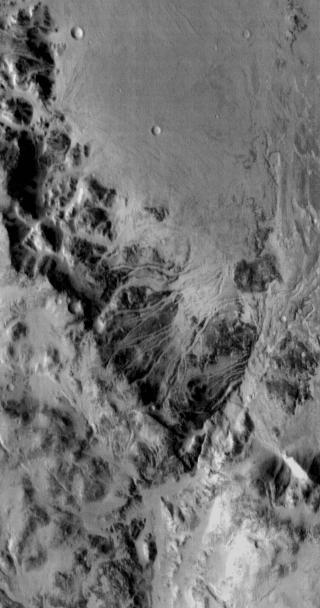
Close-up of channels on rim of Holden crater, as seen by THEMIS

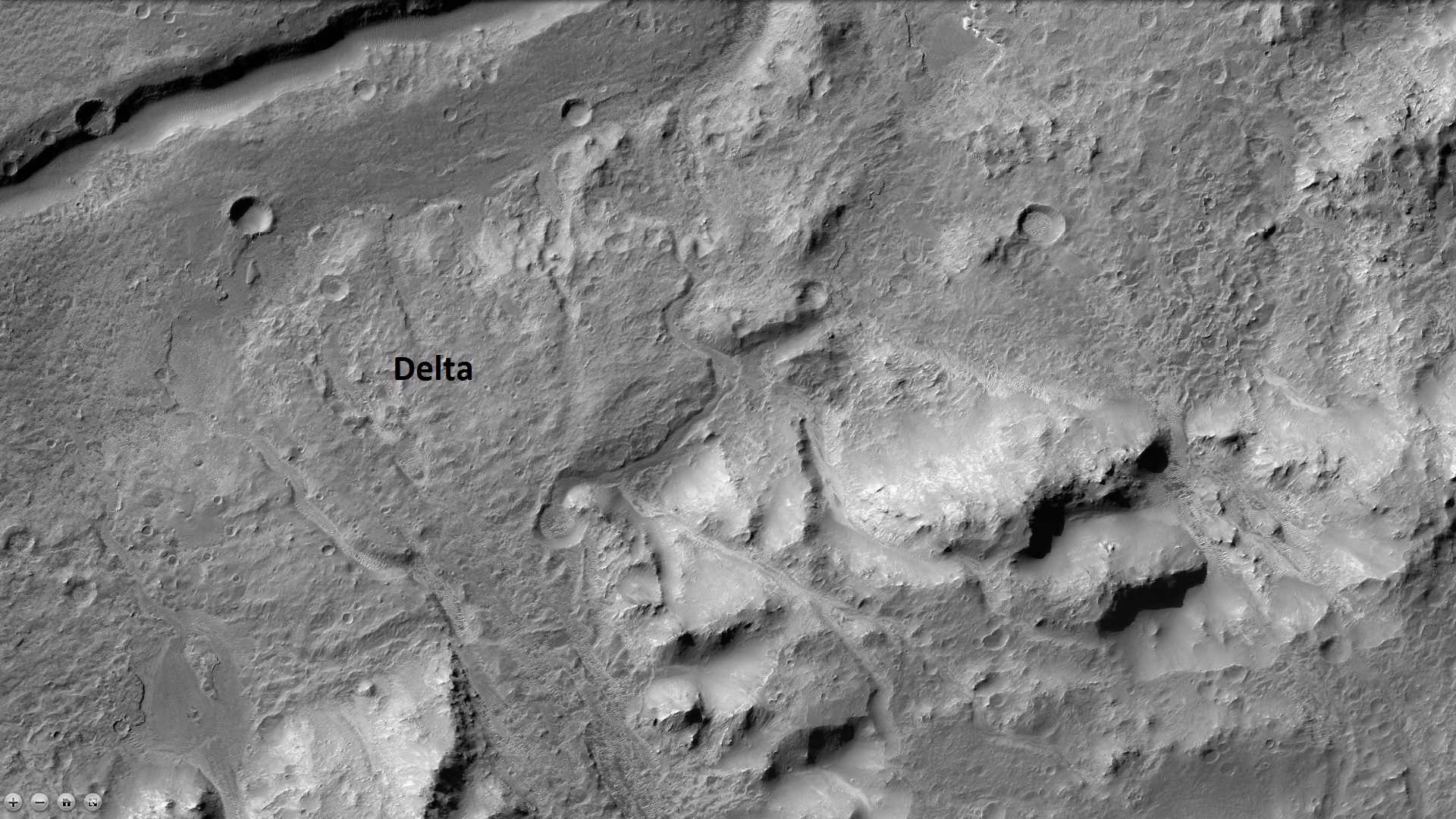
Wide view of a delta in Holden crater, as seen by CTX

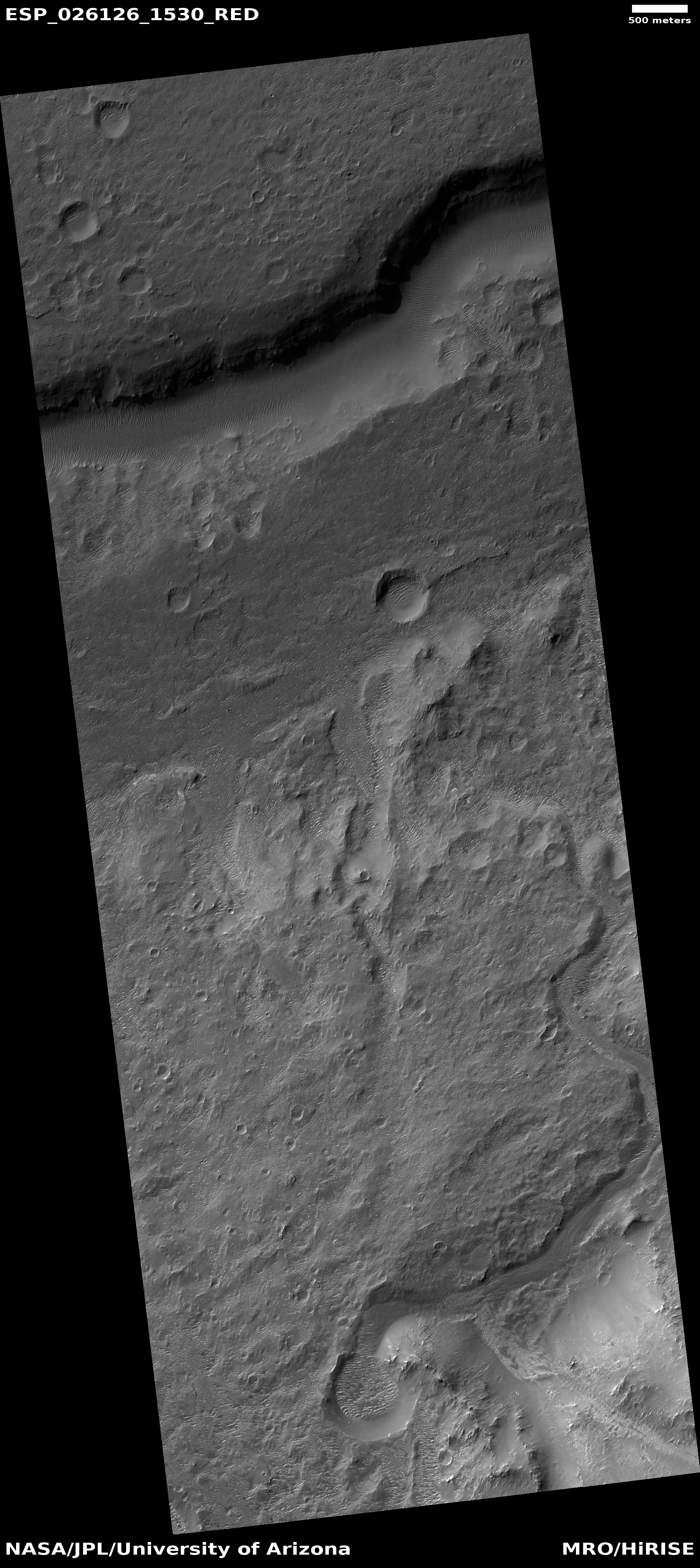
Close up view of part of delta from the previous image, as seen by HiRISE under HiWish program

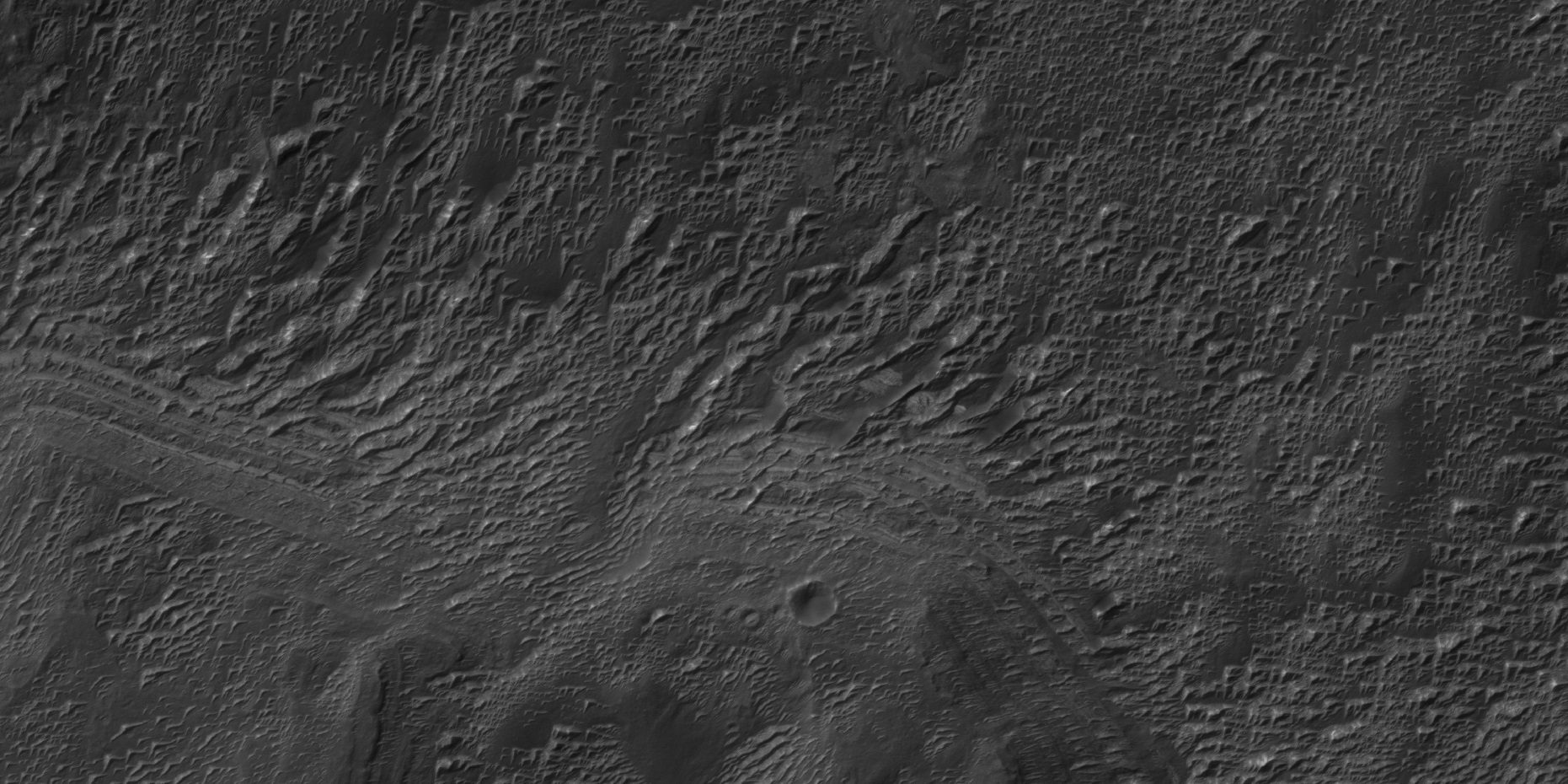
Close view of the previous image showing layers, as seen by HiRISE under HiWish program and enlarged with HiView

== Geologic history of Holden crater ==
Studies of the whole region around Holden crater have resulted in an understanding of a complex sequence of events that shaped the crater, which included two different lakes. A large series of rivers called the Uzboi-Ladon-Morava (ULM) system drained water from the Argyre Basin, the site of a large lake. When an impact occurred and produced Holden crater, the system was blocked by a crater rim almost a kilometer in height. Eventually, water from drainage from the walls, with possibly a contribution from groundwater, collected to make the first lake. This lake was deep and long-lasting. The lowest level of sedimentary rocks was deposited in this lake. Much water was inbounded in Uzboi Vallis because the rim of Holden blocked the flow. Some of the backed-up water came from Nirgal Vallis which had a discharge of 4800 cubic meters/second. At a certain point, the stored water broke through the rim of Holden and created a second, shorter-lived lake 200–250 m deep. Water with a depth of at least 50 m entered Holden at a rate that 5-10 times the discharge of the Mississippi River. Terraces and the presence of large rocks (tens of meters across) support these high discharge rates.

== Mars Science Laboratory ==
Several sites in the Margaritifer Sinus quadrangle were proposed as areas to send NASA's major Mars rover, the Mars Science Laboratory, Curiosity. Holden crater made the cut to be among the top four, although Gale crater was chosen as the final landing site. Holden crater is believed to have once been a lake.

The aim of the Mars Science Laboratory is to search for signs of ancient life. It is hoped that a later mission could then return samples from sites identified as probably containing remains of life. To safely bring the craft down, a 12 mile wide, smooth, flat circle is needed. Geologists hope to examine places where water once ponded, and want to examine sediment layers.

Although the Curiosity rover landed in Gale crater, Holden was one of the seven finalists for the MSL landing site, which also included Eberswalde crater, Mawrth Vallis, Miyamoto crater, Nili Fossae trough, and southern Meridiani Planum.

Breccia in the crater Holden, taken by HiRISE

.

== See also ==
- List of craters on Mars
