= Ares Vallis =

Vallis on Mars

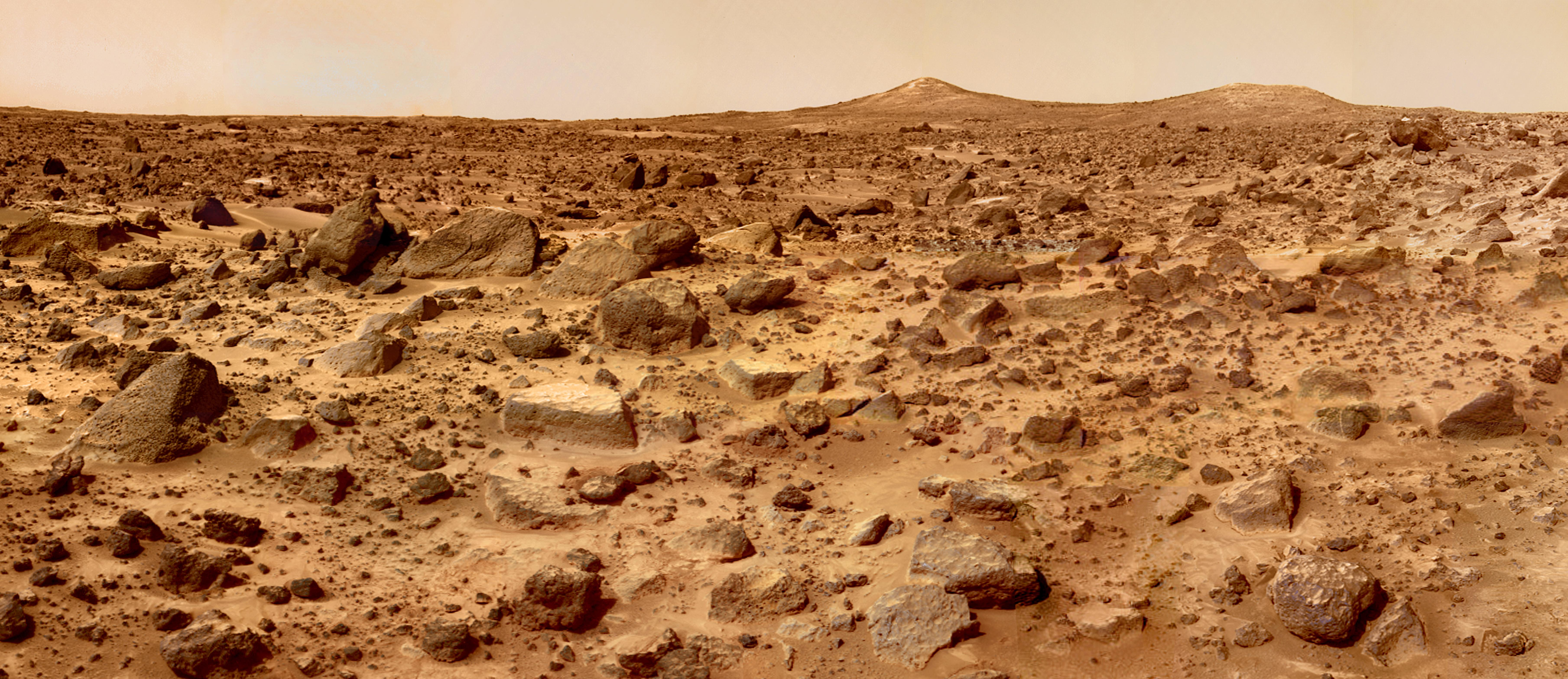
- Mars Pathfinder (at 19.13 N, 33.22 W) photographed the region where Ares Vallis borders Chryse
- Coordinates: 10.4°N 25.8°W
- Length: 1,700 km (1,100 mi)

Ares Vallis /ˈɛəriːz ˈvælɪs/ is an outflow channel on Mars, named after the Greek name for Mars: Ares, the god of war; it appears to have been carved by fluids, perhaps water. The valley 'flows' northwest out of the hilly Margaritifer Terra, where the Iani Chaos depression 180 km (110 mi) long and 200 km (120 mi) wide) is connected to the beginning of Ares Vallis by a 100 km (62 mi) wide transition zone centered on 342.5° East (17.5 West) and 3° North. It then continues through the ancient Xanthe Terra highlands, and ends in a delta-like region of Chryse Planitia. Ares Vallis was the landing site of NASA's Mars Pathfinder spacecraft, which studied a region of the valley near the border with Chryse in 1997.

Ares Vallis is in the Oxia Palus quadrangle of Mars.

It has been argued that Uzboi, Ladon, Margaritifer and Ares valles, although now separated by large craters, once comprised a single outflow channel, flowing north into Chryse Planitia. The source of this outflow has been suggested as overflow from the Argyre Crater, formerly filled to the brim as a lake by channels (Surius, Dzigai, and Palacopus Valles) draining down from the south pole. If real, the full length of this drainage system would be over 8,000 km (5,000 mi), the longest known drainage path in the Solar System. Under this suggestion, the extant form of the outflow channel Ares Vallis would thus be a remolding of a pre-existing structure. This long path for water flow has been named the * Uzboi-Landon-Morava (ULM) system. Water from this system may have helped to form Ares Vallis.

Research, published in January 2010, suggests that Mars had lakes, each around 20 km (12 mi) wide, along parts of the equator. Although earlier research showed that Mars had a warm and wet early history that has long since dried up, these lakes existed in the Hesperian Epoch, a much earlier period. Using detailed images from NASA's Mars Reconnaissance Orbiter, the researchers speculate that there may have been increased volcanic activity, meteorite impacts or shifts in Mars' orbit during this period to warm Mars' atmosphere enough to melt the abundant ice present in the ground. Volcanoes would have released gases that thickened the atmosphere for a temporary period, trapping more sunlight and making it warm enough for liquid water to exist. In this new study, channels were discovered that connected lake basins near Ares Vallis. When one lake filled up, its waters overflowed the banks and carved the channels to a lower area where another lake would form. These lakes would be another place to look for evidence of present or past life.

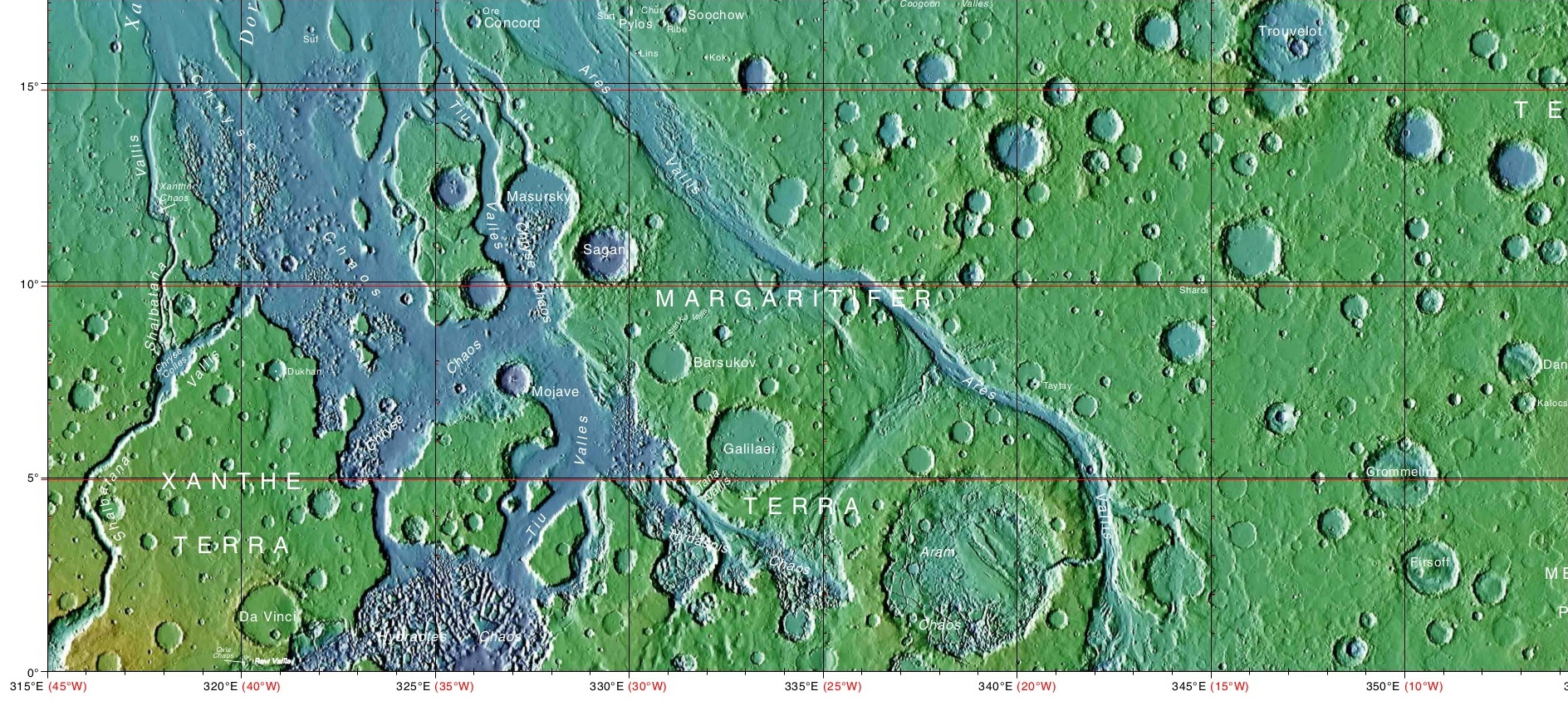
Topographic map of the Oxia Palus region on Mars, showing the location of a number of chaos regions and valleys, including Ares Vallis.

== See also ==
- Chaos terrain
- Geology of Mars
- HiRISE
- Lakes on Mars
- List of areas of chaos terrain on Mars
- Martian chaos terrain
- Outburst flood
- Mars Pathfinder
- Outflow channels
- Uzboi-Landon-Morava (ULM)
