= Nirgal Vallis =

Vallis on Mars

- Nirgal Vallis based on THEMIS day-time image
- Coordinates: 28.4°S 42°W
- Naming: the word for "Mars" in Babylonian

Nirgal Vallis is a long river channel bordering the Coprates quadrangle and Margaritifer Sinus quadrangle of Mars at 28.4° south latitude and 42° west longitude. It is 610 km long and is named after Nergal, the Babylonian god of war and counterpart to the Roman god of war Mars. Nirgal Vallis had a discharge of 4800 cubic meters/second. The western half of Nirgal Valles is a branched system, but the eastern half is a tightly sinuous, deeply entrenched valley. Nirgal Valles ends at Uzboi Vallis. Tributaries are very short and end in steep-walled valley heads, often called "amphitheater-headed valleys." The shape of these valley heads is like cirques on the Earth.

Water from Nirgal Vallis contributed to a great flood that went through the rim of Holden Crater and helped form a lake in the crater. It is estimated that Nirgal Vallis had a discharge of 4800 cubic meters/second. Water from Nirgal Vallis was inbounded in Uzboi Vallis because the rim of Holden Crater blocked the flow. At a certain point the stored water broke through the rim of Holden and created a lake 200–250 m deep. Water with a depth of at least 50 m entered Holden at a rate that 5-10 times the discharge of the Mississippi River. Terraces and the presence of large rocks (tens of meters across) support these high discharge rates.

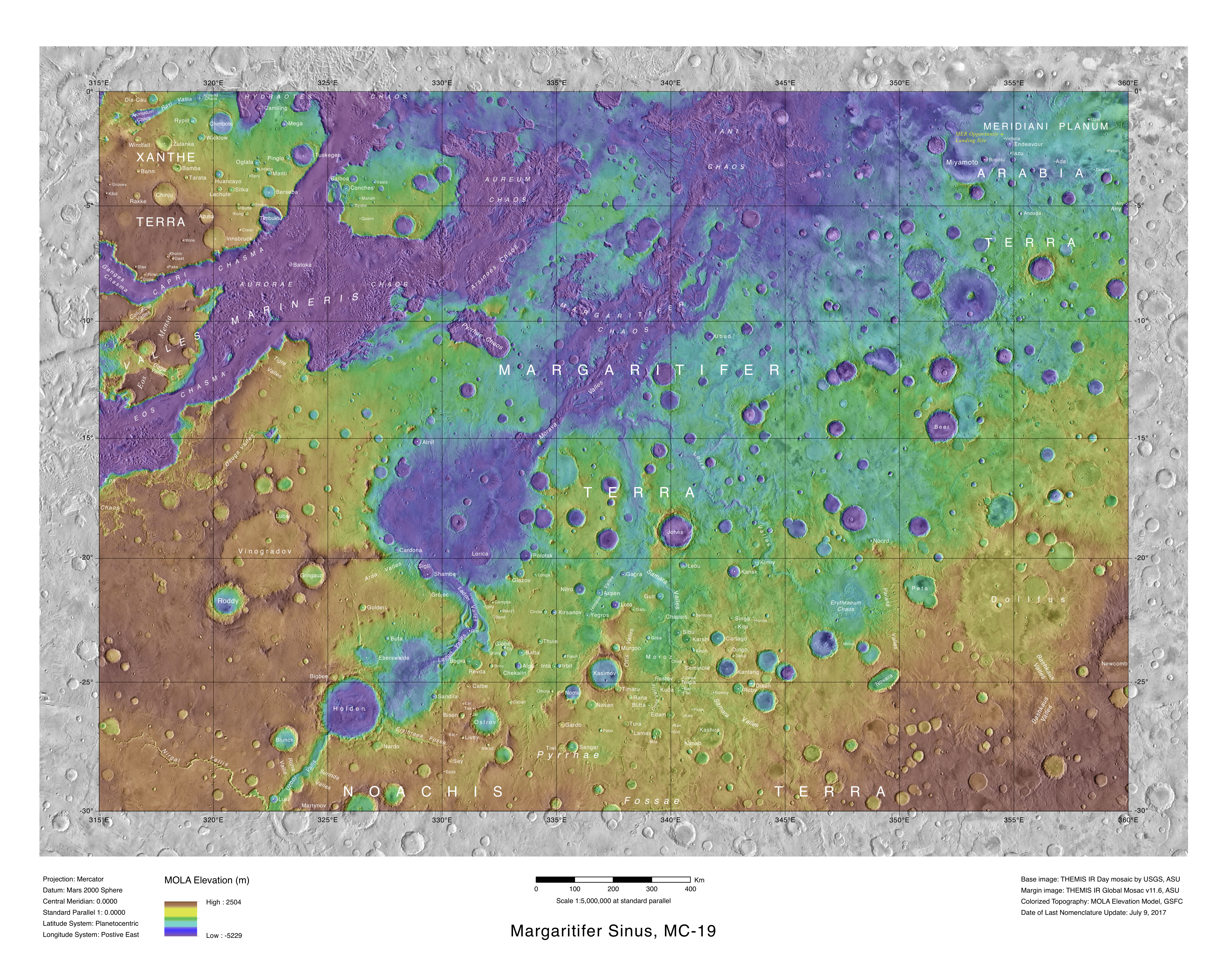
Map showing locations Nirgal Vallis and other nearby valleys

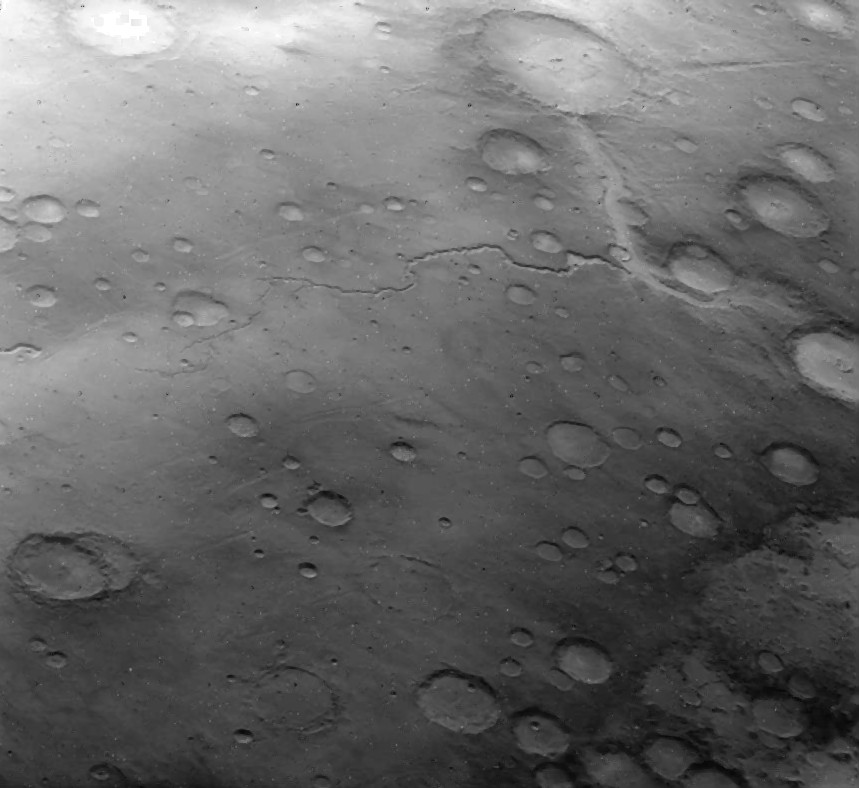
Viking Orbiter 1 image showing the entire valley

== Nirgal Vallis and sapping ==
Nirgal Valles is one of the longest valley networks on Mars. It is so large that it is found on two quadrangles. Scientists are not sure about how all the ancient river valleys were formed. There is evidence that instead of rain or snow, the water that formed the valleys originated under ground. One mechanism that has been advanced is sapping. In this case, the ground just gives away as water comes out. Sapping is common in some desert areas in America's Southwest. It forms alcoves and stubby tributaries; these features are visible in the pictures below of Nirgal Vallis taken with Mars Odyssey's THEMIS.

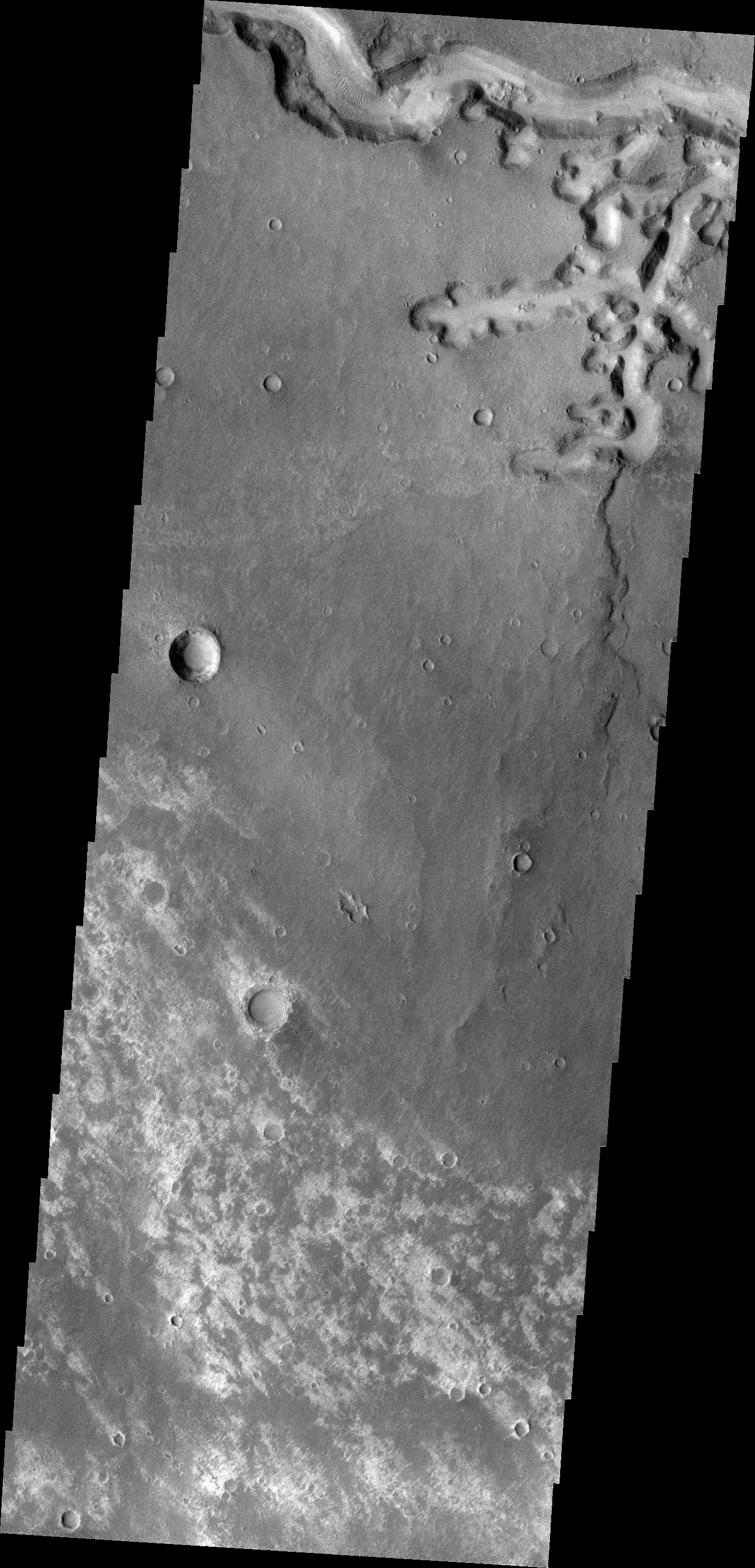
Nirgal Vallis, as seen by THEMIS.

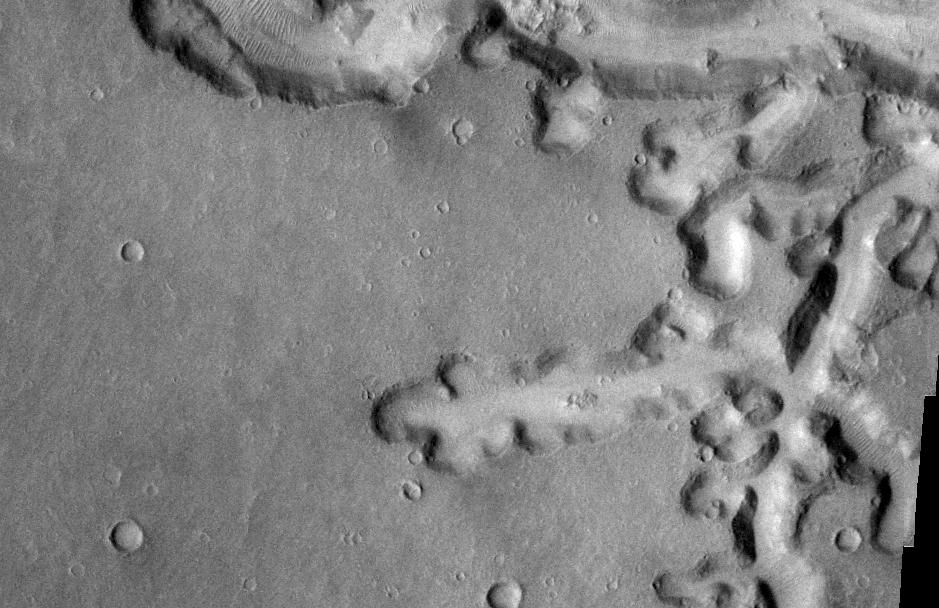
Nirgal Vallis Close-up, as seen by THEMIS.

== See also ==
- Geology of Mars – Scientific study of the surface, crust, and interior of the planet Mars
- Groundwater on Mars – Water held in permeable ground
- Lakes on Mars – Former bodies of water on Mars
- List of quadrangles on Mars – Geographic subunits of the surface of Mars
- Vallis – Valley landform on other planets (mostly Mars)
- Uzboi-Landon-Morava (ULM) – Series of channels and depressions that may have carried water across a major part of Mars
- Water on Mars – Study of past and present water on Mars
