= Auqakuh Vallis =

Valley on Mars

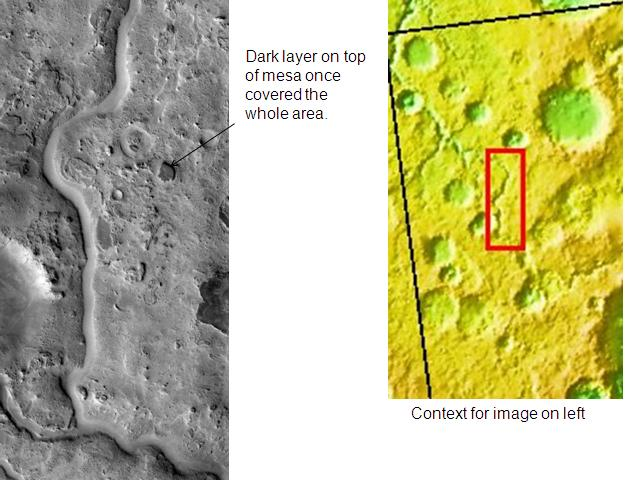
- Auqakuh Vallis. At one time a dark layer covered the whole area, now only a few pieces remain as buttes.
- Coordinates: 30.4°N 299.9°W

Auqakuh Vallis is an ancient river valley in the Syrtis Major quadrangle on Mars, located at 30.4° north latitude and 299.9° west longitude. It is 312 km long, and is named for the word for 'Mars' in Quechua (Inca).

== Buttes ==
Many places on Mars have buttes that are similar to buttes on Earth, such as the famous ones in Monument Valley, Utah. Buttes are formed when most of a layer(s) of rocks are removed from an area. Buttes usually have a hard, erosion-resistant cap rock on the top. The cap rock causes the top of a butte to be flat. An example of a butte in the Syrtis Major quadrangle is shown in a picture on this page.
