= Uzboi Vallis =

Vallis on Mars

- Uzboi Vallis based on THEMIS day-time image
- Coordinates: 29.8°S 37.1°W
- Length: 366.0
- Naming: Dry riverbed in Turkmenistan.

Uzboi Vallis is a valley lying situated within the Margaritifer Sinus quadrangle (MC-19) region on Mars. It is named after the Uzboy dry channel, now in Turkmenistan, which repeatedly served as the main channel of the Amu Darya river. The valley begins on the northern rim of the Argyre basin, and cuts through several craters, before ending at Holden crater.

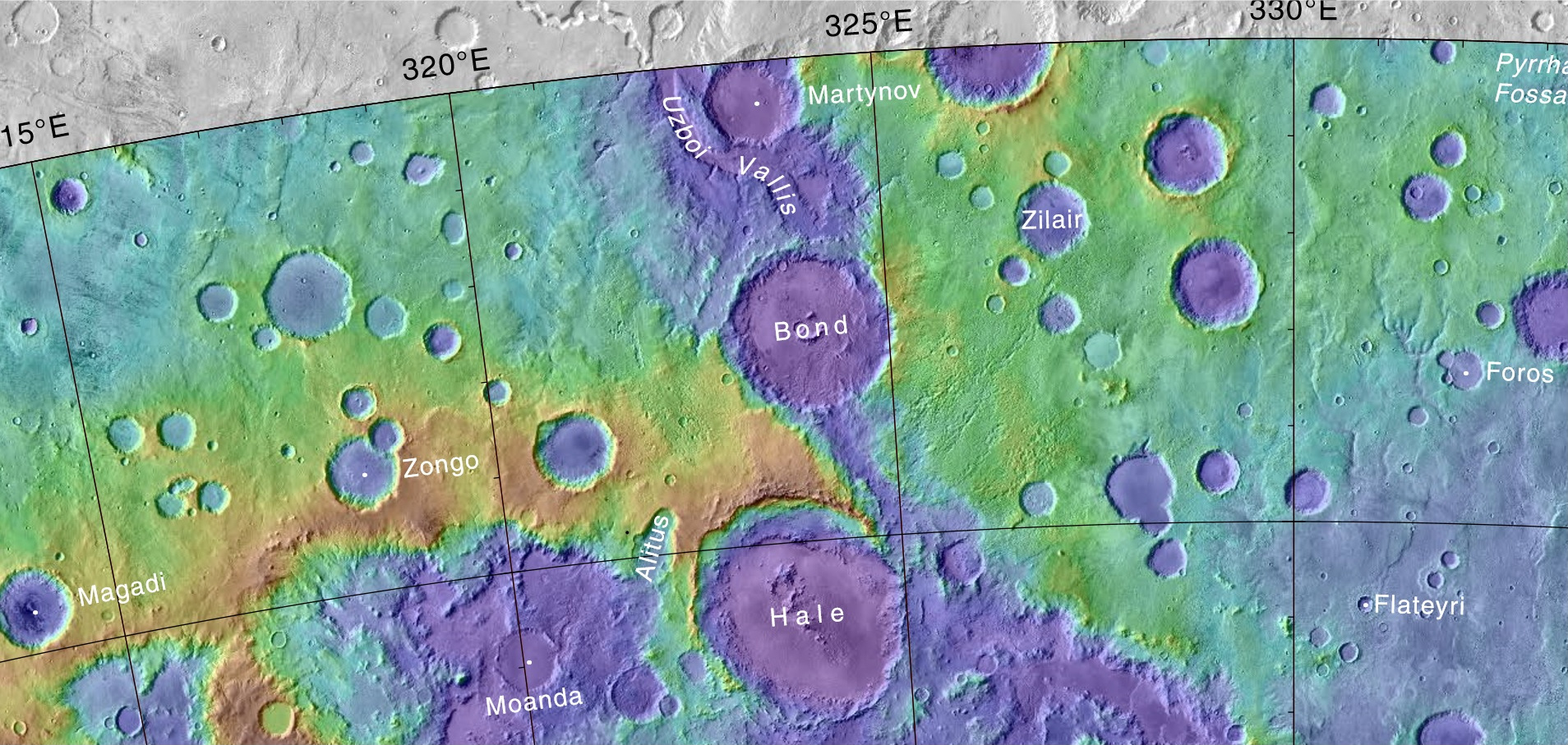
Part of Uzboi Vallis along with nearby craters. Colors relate to elevation.

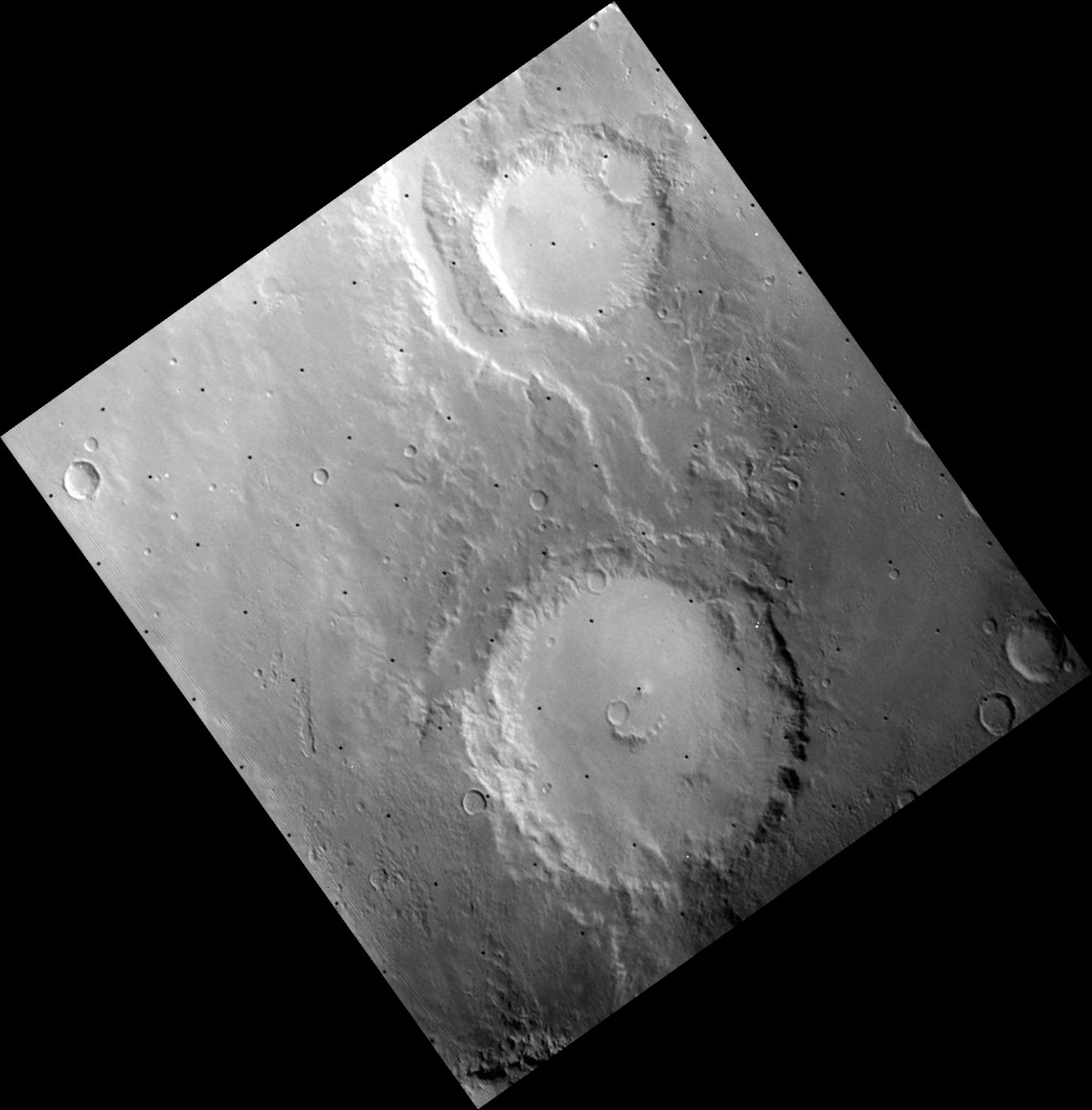
Bond crater (bottom), Uzboi Vallis, and Martynov crater (top) (Viking Orbiter 1 image)

Uzboi Vallis is believed to have been formed by running water. It is believed that layers were formed on the floor of Uzboi Vallis (as shown in the HiRISE image below) when drainage was blocked by the impact that formed Holden Crater to the north. Eventually the lake in the area of Uzboi Vallis went high enough to overtop the rim of Holden. The water then eroded the deposits to expose the layers as they are today. The sediments that make up the layers appear to be coarse in size, suggesting they were probably formed by a rapid flow. The more narrow and sinuous Nirgal Vallis ends at Uzboi Vallis and emptied into it.

It has been suggested that Uzboi, Ladon, Margaritifer and Ares Valles, although now separated by large craters, once comprised a single outflow channel flowing north into Chryse Planitia. The source of this outflow has been suggested as overflow from the Argyre crater, formerly filled to the brim as a lake by channels (Surius, Dzigai, and Palacopus Valles) draining down from the south pole. If real, the full length of this drainage system would be over 8000 km, the longest known drainage path in the Solar System. This system has been called the Uzboi-Landon-Morava (ULM) system.

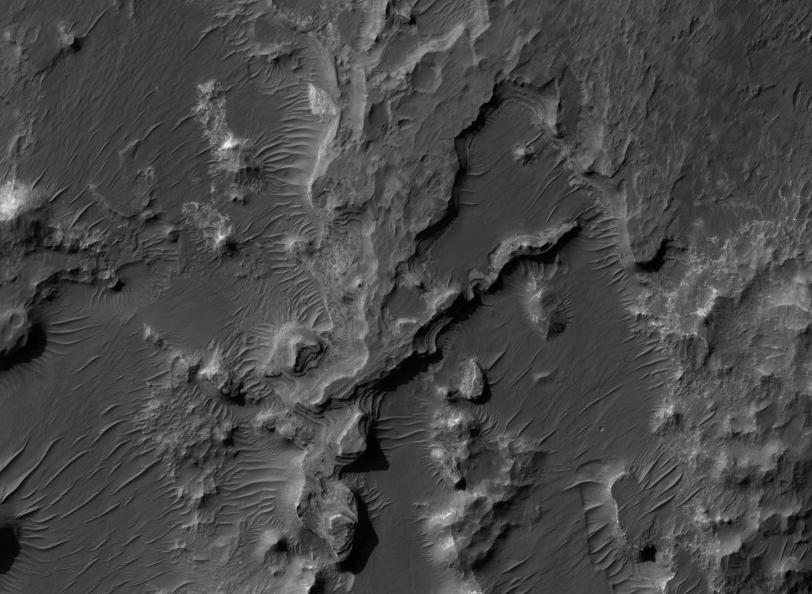
Layers in Uzboi Vallis, as seen by HiRISE. Image located in the Margaritifer Sinus quadrangle.
