= Uzboi-Landon-Morava =

Martian geological feature

The Uzboi-Landon-Morava (ULM) outflow system is a long series of channels and depressions that may have carried water across a major part of Mars. It starts with channels that drain into the Argyre basin in the Argyre quadrangle. Water ponded in the Argyre basin, then the overflow is believed to have traveled northward through Uzboi Vallis, into Landon basin, through Morava Valles, to the floor of Margaritifer basin. Some of the water may have helped to carve Ares Vallis. Altogether, the total area drained for this watershed may have been about 11 X 10^{6} km^{2} or about 9% of Mars.

Pictures below show the Argyre basin which was once full of water. Also, the wider view shows the distance the water traveled, which was south of Argyre basin to Margaritifer Terra.

== Gallery ==
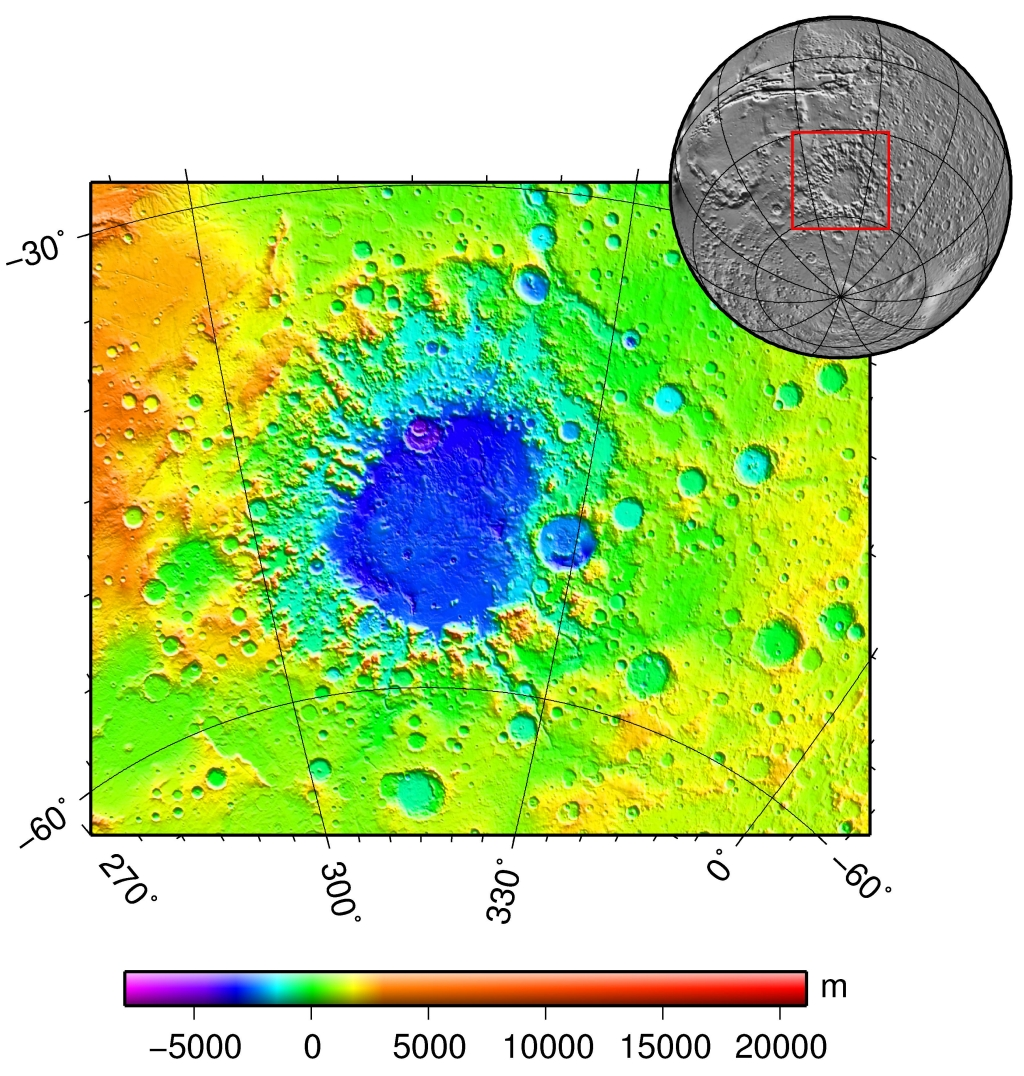
MOLA maps showing the geographic context of Argyre.

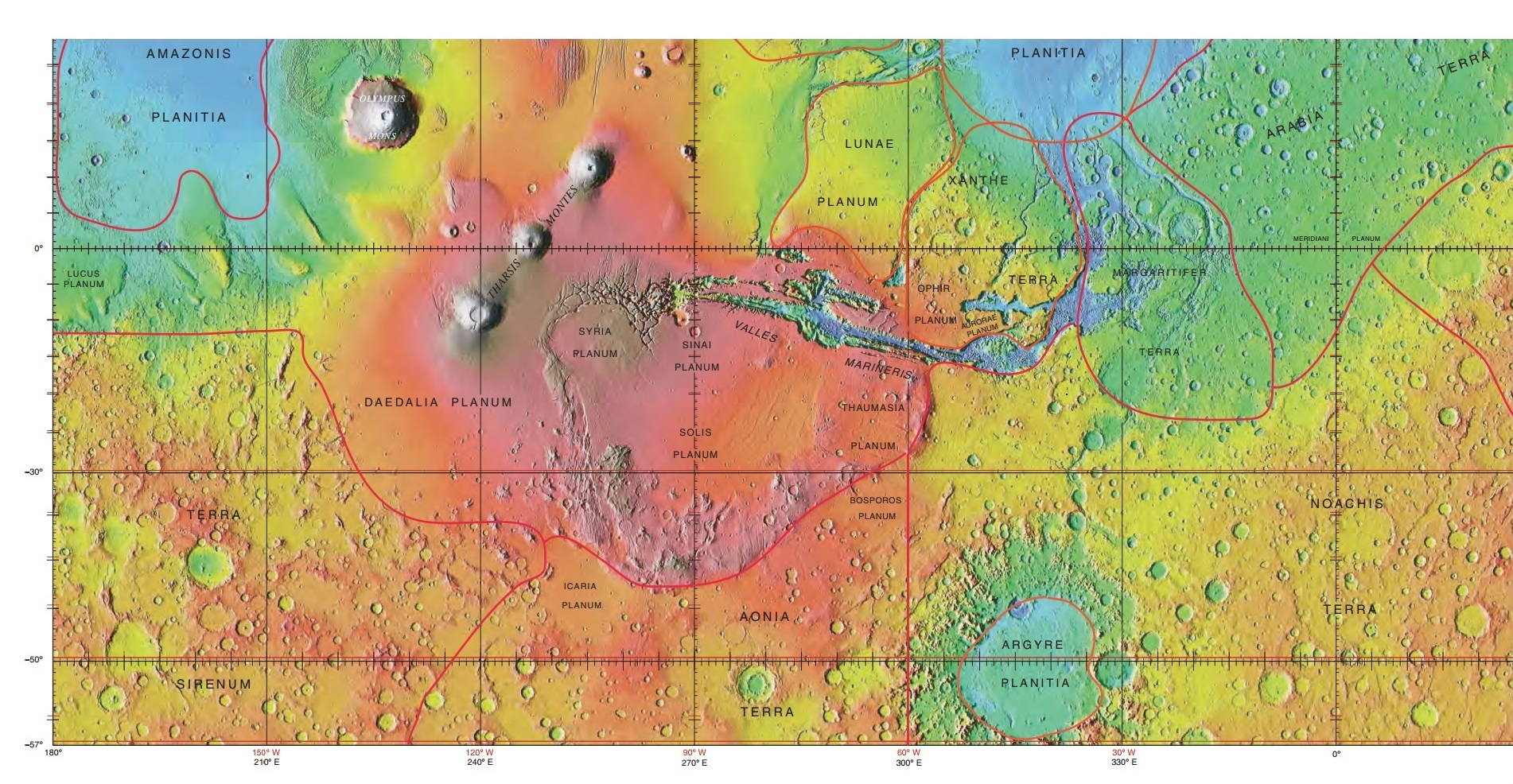
MOLA map showing boundaries for Argyre Planitia and other regions

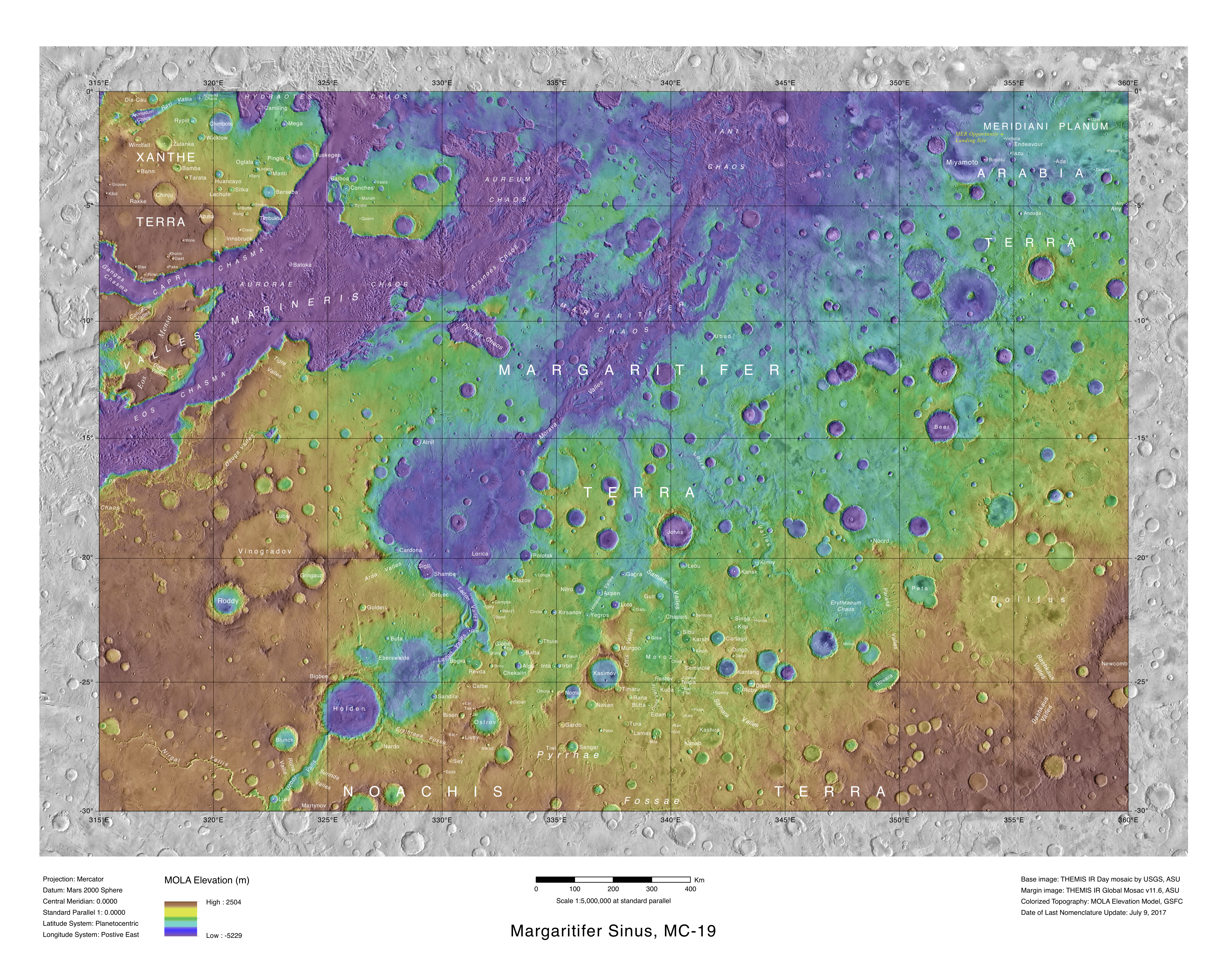
Map showing locations Uzboi Vallis and Ladon Vallis, other nearby features

== See also ==
- Argyre quadrangle – Map of Mars
- Geography of Mars – Delineation and characterization of Martian regions
- Holden (Martian crater) – Martian crater
- Lakes on Mars – Former bodies of water on Mars
- Margaritifer Sinus quadrangle – One of a series of 30 quadrangle maps of Mars
