= Argyre Planitia =

Crater on Mars

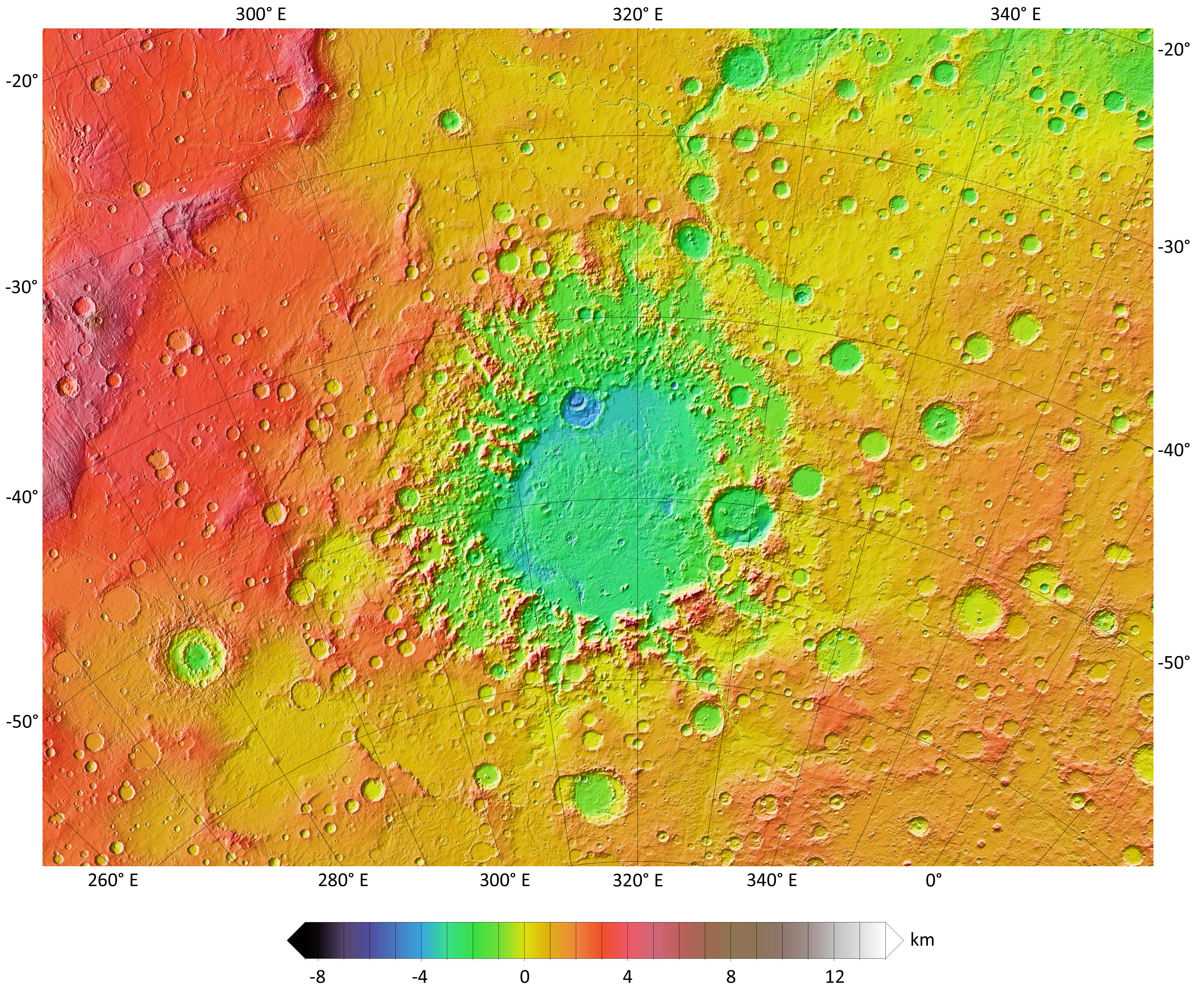
- Colorized topographic map of Argyre basin and its surroundings, from the MOLA instrument of Mars Global Surveyor
- Location: Argyre quadrangle, Mars
- Coordinates: 49.7°S 316.0°E
- Diameter: c. 1,700 km (1,100 mi)
- Depth: c. 5.2 km (17,000 ft)
- Impactor diameter: c. 200 km
- Age: c. 3.9 billion years
- Eponym: Legendary island Argyre

Argyre Planitia /ˈɑːrdʒəriː/ is a plain located within the impact basin Argyre (Note: Officially, Argyre is an albedo feature.) in the southern highlands of Mars. Its name comes from a map produced by Giovanni Schiaparelli in 1877; it refers to Argyre, a mythical island of silver in Greek mythology.

Argyre is centered at 49.7°S 316.0°E and lies between 35° and 61° S and 27° and 62° W in the Argyre quadrangle. The basin is approximately 1,700 km (1,100 mi) wide and drops 5.2 km (17,000 ft) below the surrounding plains; it is the second-deepest impact basin on Mars after Hellas. Galle Crater, located on the east rim of Argyre at 51°S 31°W, resembles a smiley face.

The basin was formed by a giant impact event by an impactor around 200 kilometres (120 mi) in diameter during the Late Heavy Bombardment of the early Solar System, approximately 4–3.8 billion years ago, and may be one of the best preserved ancient impact basins from that period. Argyre is surrounded by rugged massifs which form concentric and radial patterns around the basin. Several mountain ranges are present, some of these mountain ranges include Charitum and Nereidum Montes.

== Past water flows ==
Four large Noachian epoch channels lie radial to the basin. Three of these channels (Surius Vallis, Dzígai Vallis, and Pallacopas Vallis) flowed into Argyre from the south and east through the rim mountains. The fourth, Uzboi Vallis, appears to have flowed out from the basin's north rim to the Chryse region and may have drained a lake of melting ice within the basin. A smaller outflow channel named Nia Valles is relatively fresh-looking, and probably formed during the early Amazonian after the major fluvial and lacustrine episodes had finished.

The original basin floor is buried with friable, partially deflated layered material that may be lake sediment. No inner rings are visible; however, isolated massifs within the basin may be remnants of an inner ring.

== Past habitability ==
After the formation of the impact basin, heat from the impact event along with geothermal heating may have allowed for liquid water to persist for many millions of years. The lake's volume could have been equal to that of Earth's Mediterranean Sea. The basin would have supported a regional environment favorable for the origin and the persistence of life. This region shows a great deal of evidence of glacial activity with flow features, crevasse-like fractures, drumlins, eskers, tarns, arêtes, cirques, horns, U-shaped valleys, and terraces. Because of the shapes of Argyre sinuous ridges, the authors agree with previous publications in which they are eskers.

Based on morphometrical and geomorphological analysis of the Argyre eskers and their immediate surroundings, it was suggested that they formed beneath an approximately 2 km thick, stagnant (i.e., stationary) ice sheet around 3.6 billion years ago. This stagnant body of ice might have resembled a Piedmont-style glacier comparable to today's Malaspina Glacier in Alaska.

== Gallery ==
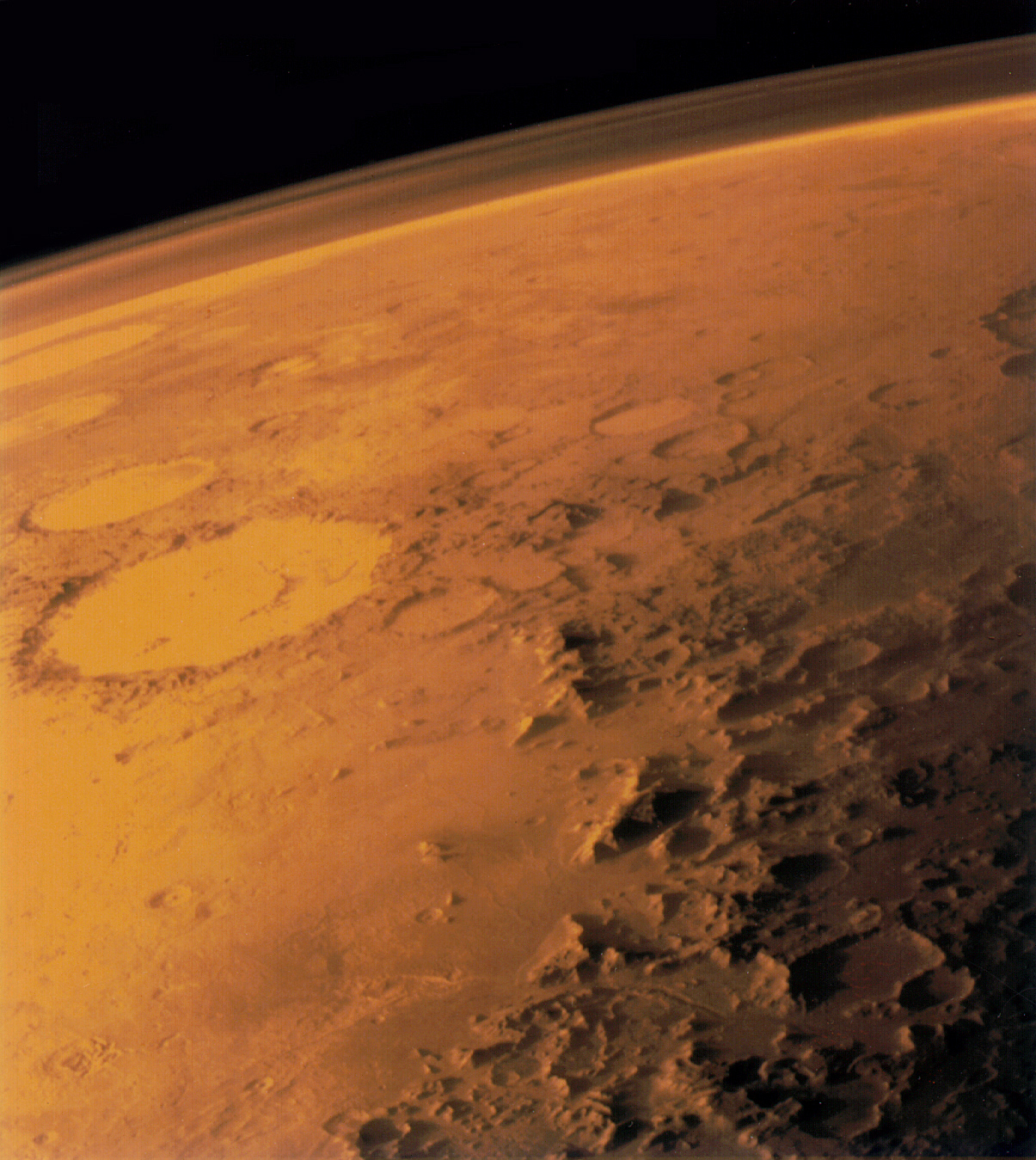
The southern rim of Argyre basin, formed by the Charitum Montes. Adjacent are sinuous ridges, theorized to be glacial eskers. Galle Crater is seen in the background.

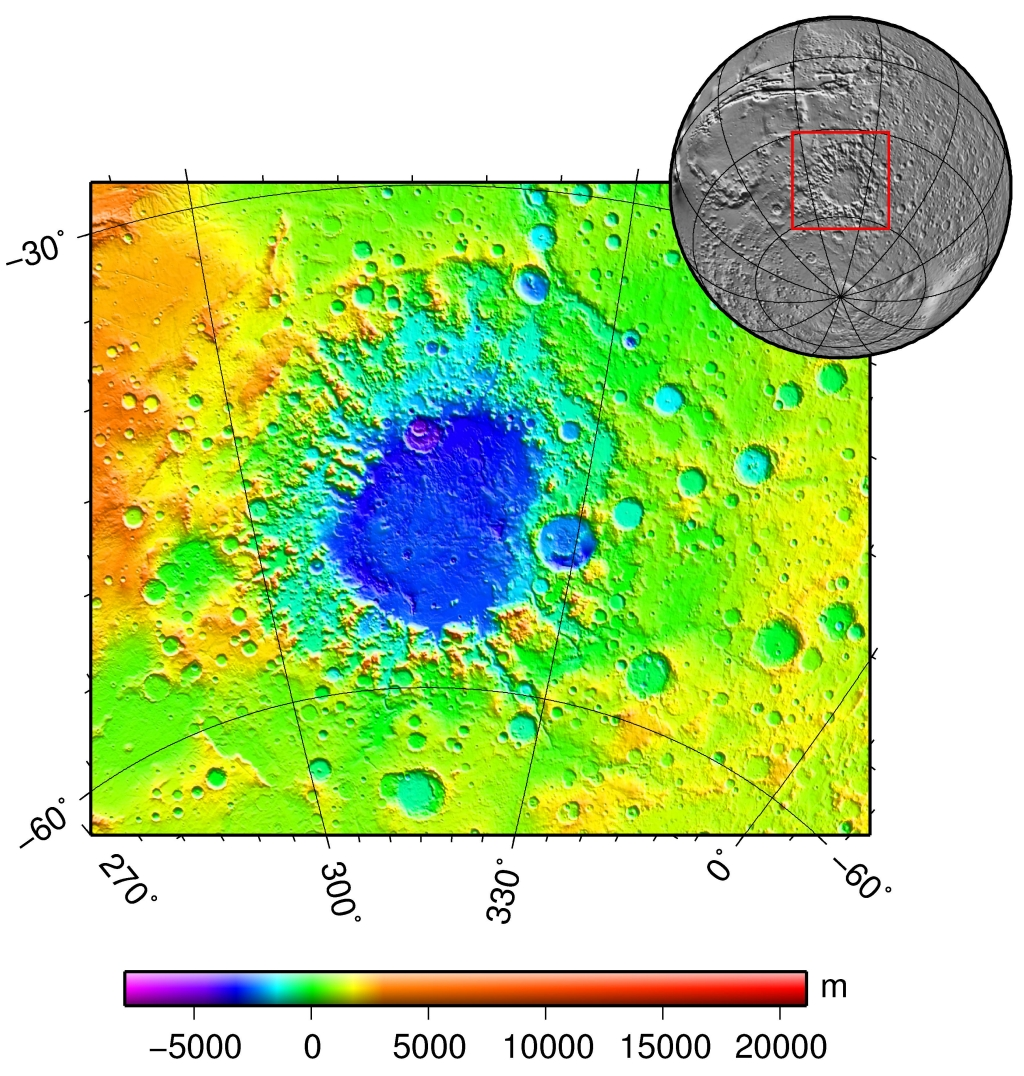
MOLA maps showing the geographic context of Argyre

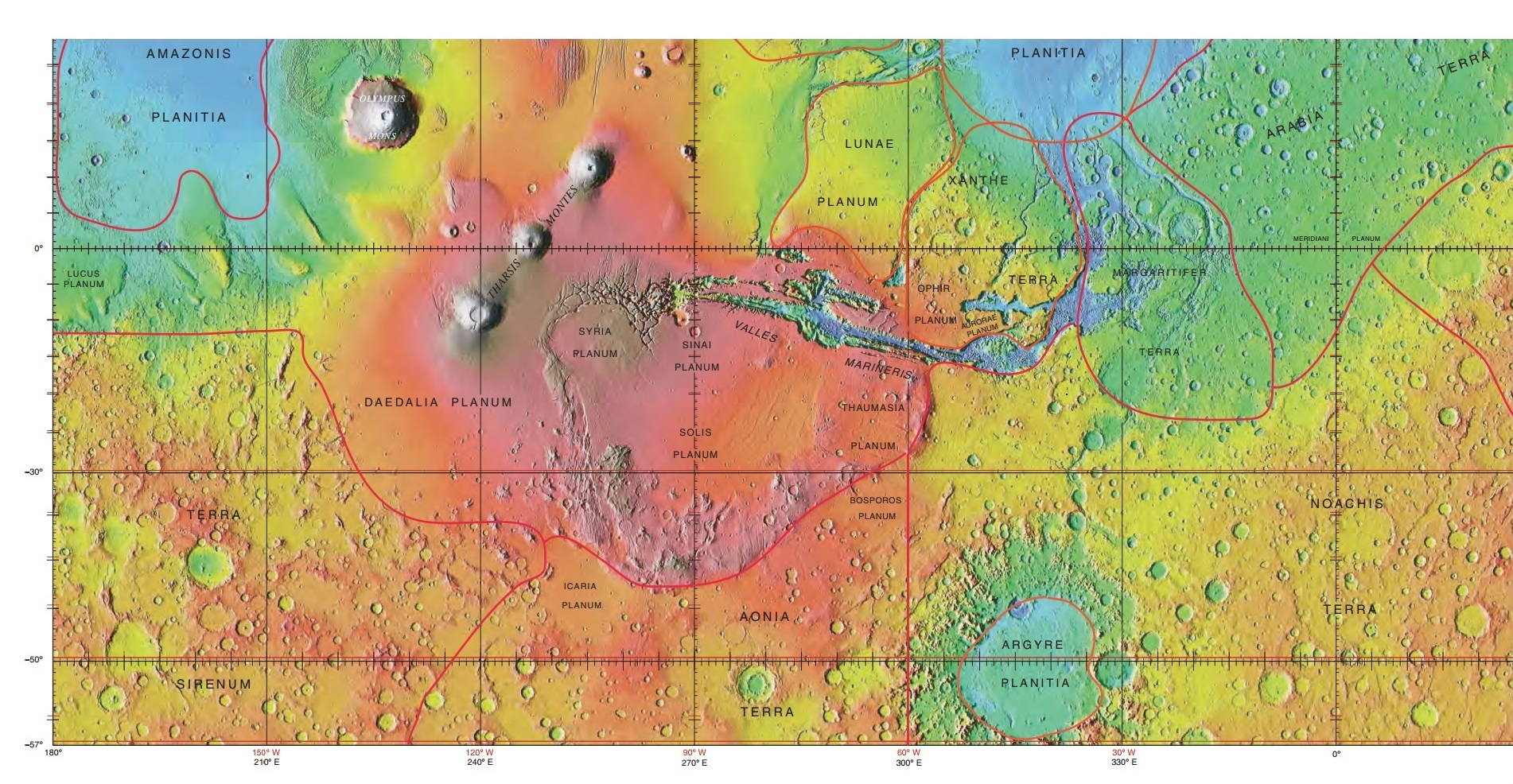
MOLA map showing boundaries for Argyre Planitia and other regions

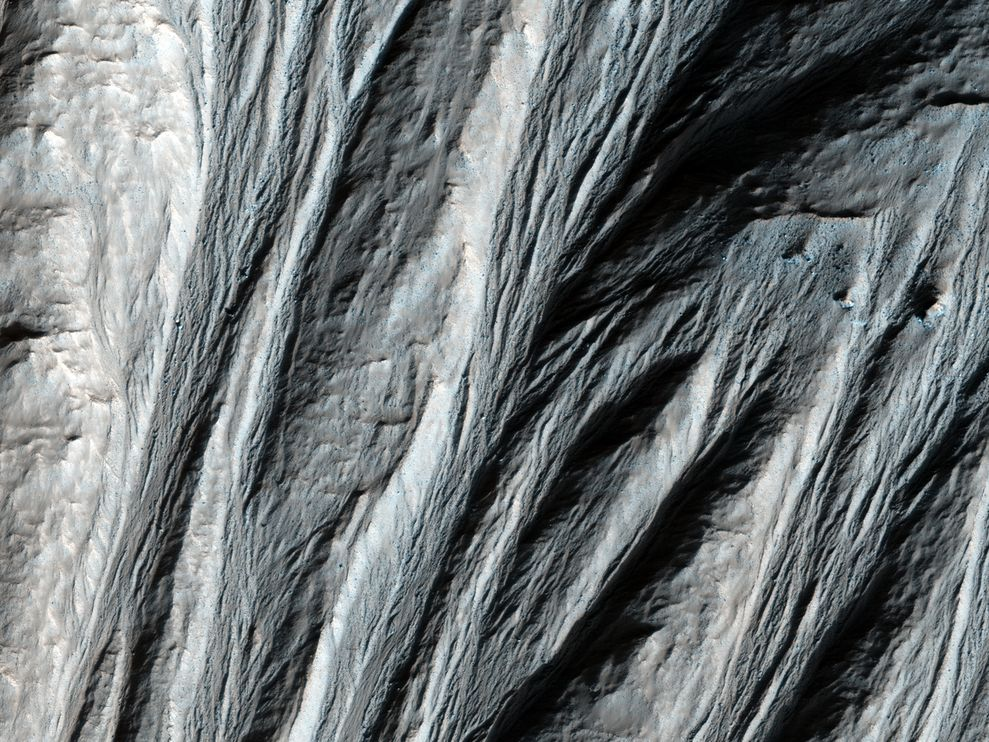
Gullies south of Argyre appear to be unequivocal evidence of water erosion

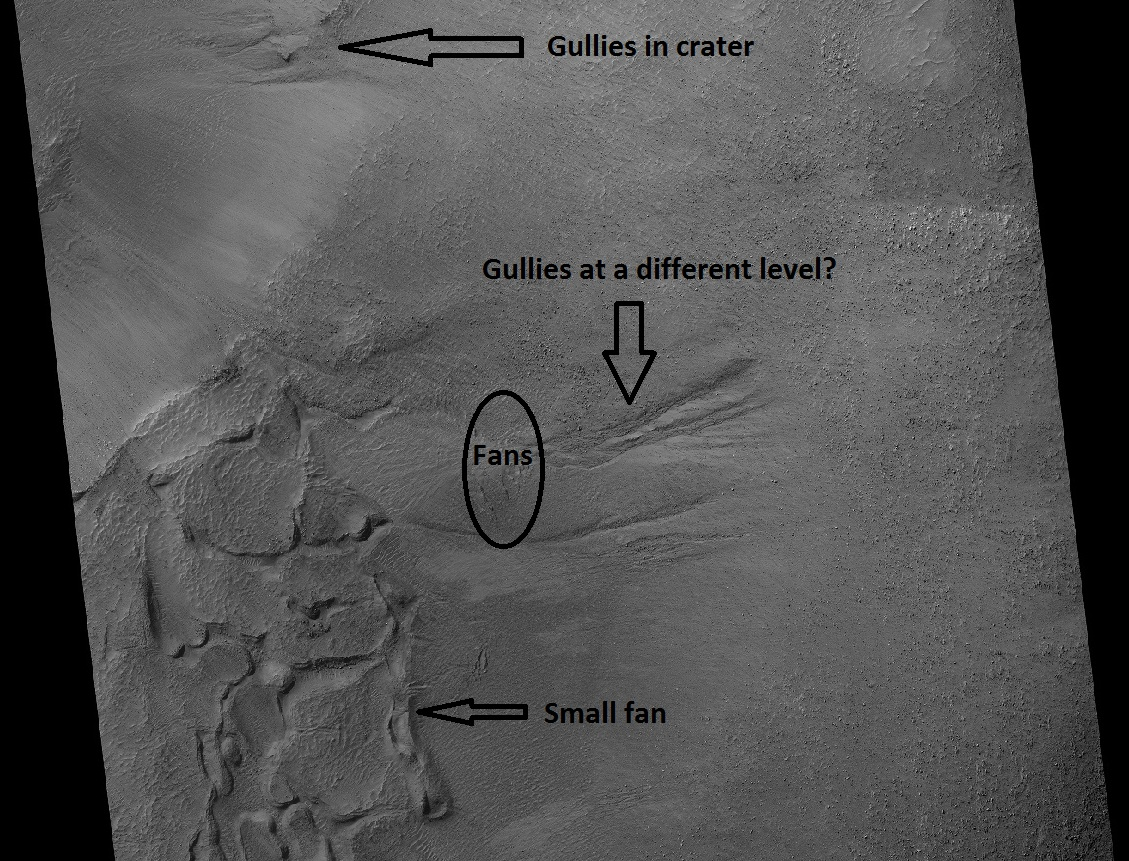
Scene in Argyre quadrangle with gullies, alluvival fans, and hollows, as seen by HiRISE under HiWish program. Enlargements of parts of this image are below.

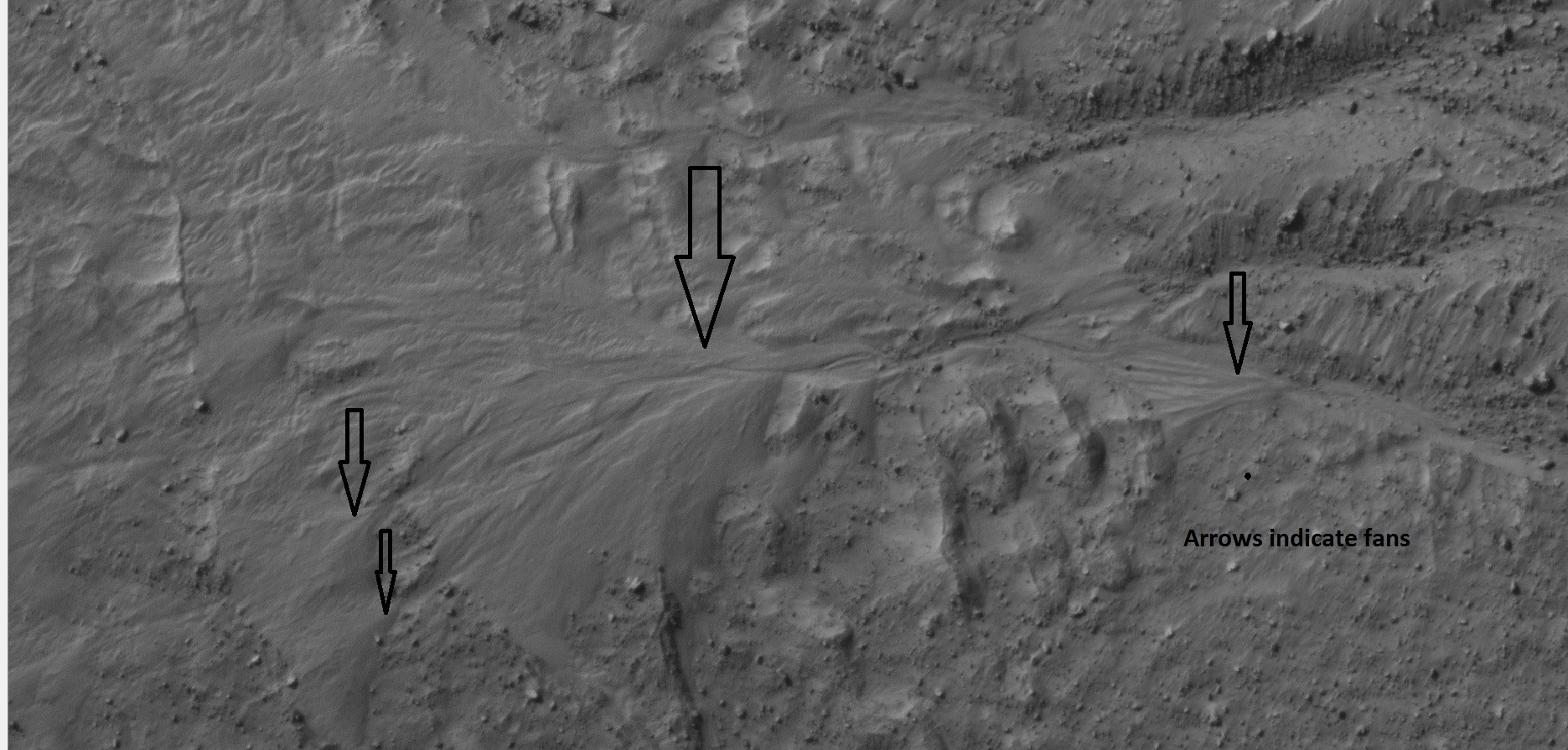
Several levels of alluvial fans, as seen by HiRISE under HiWish program. Locations of these fans are indicated in the previous image.

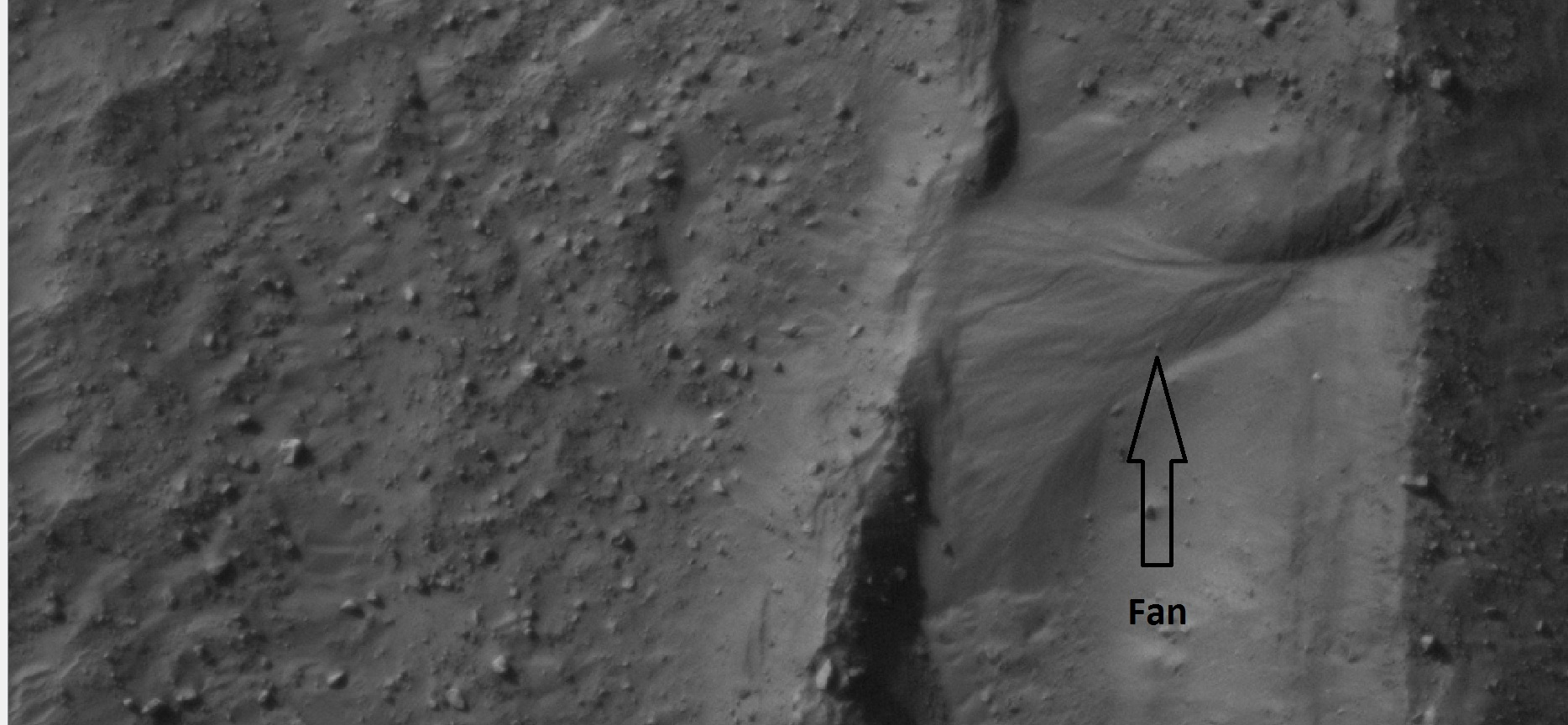
Small, well-formed alluvial fan, as seen by HiRISE under HiWish program. Location of this fan is shown in an image displayed above.

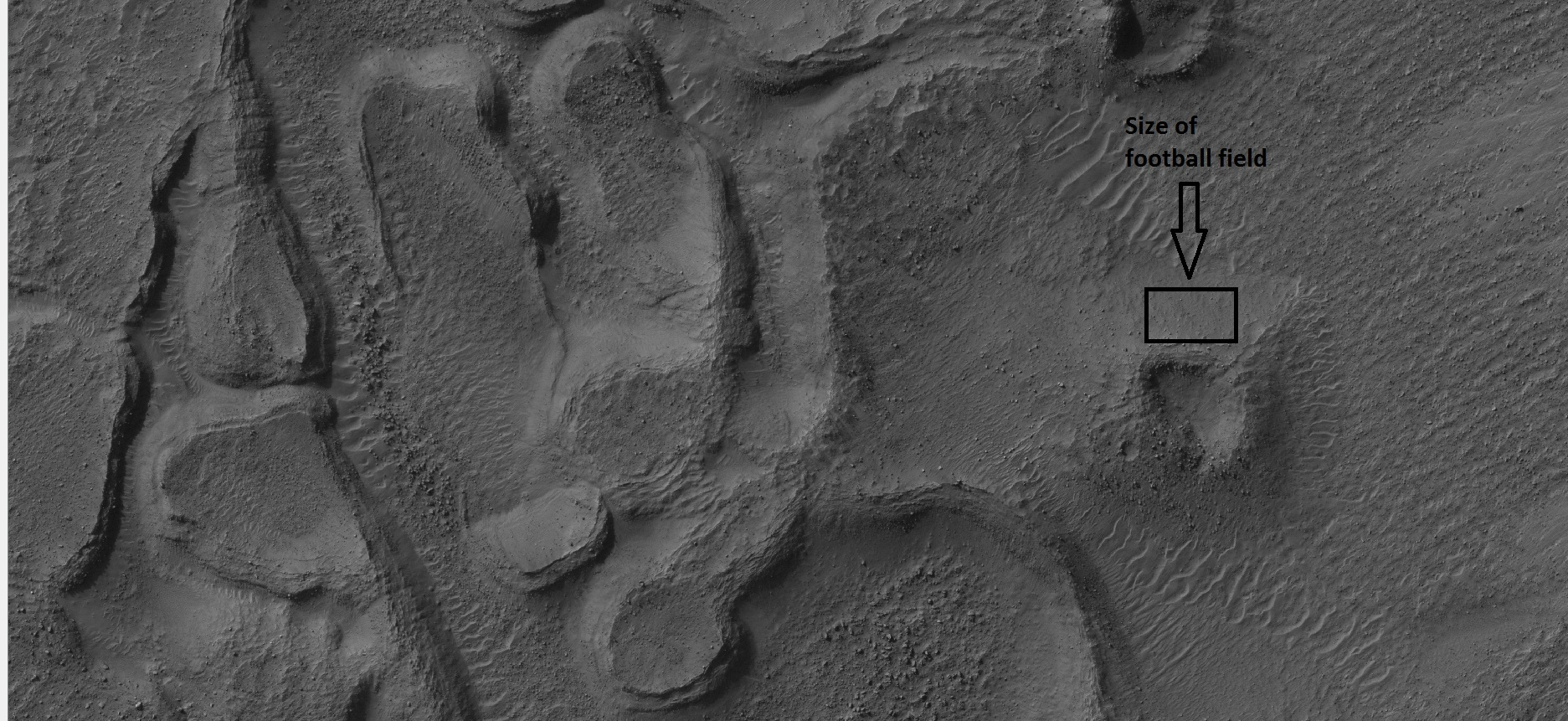
Enlargement of above image showing hollows with box showing the size of a football field, as seen by HiRISE under HiWish program

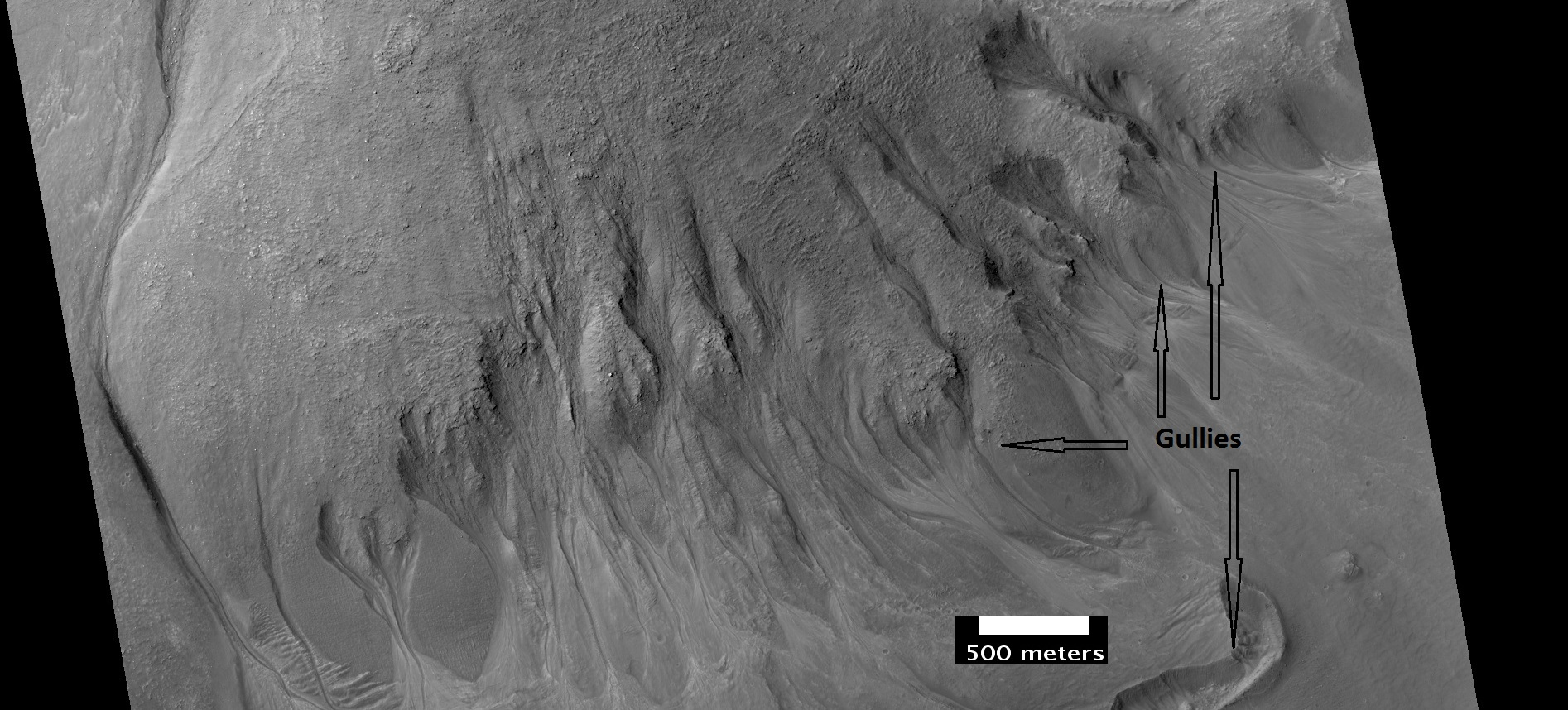
Gullies, as seen by HiRISE under HiWish program. Location is Nereidum Montes.

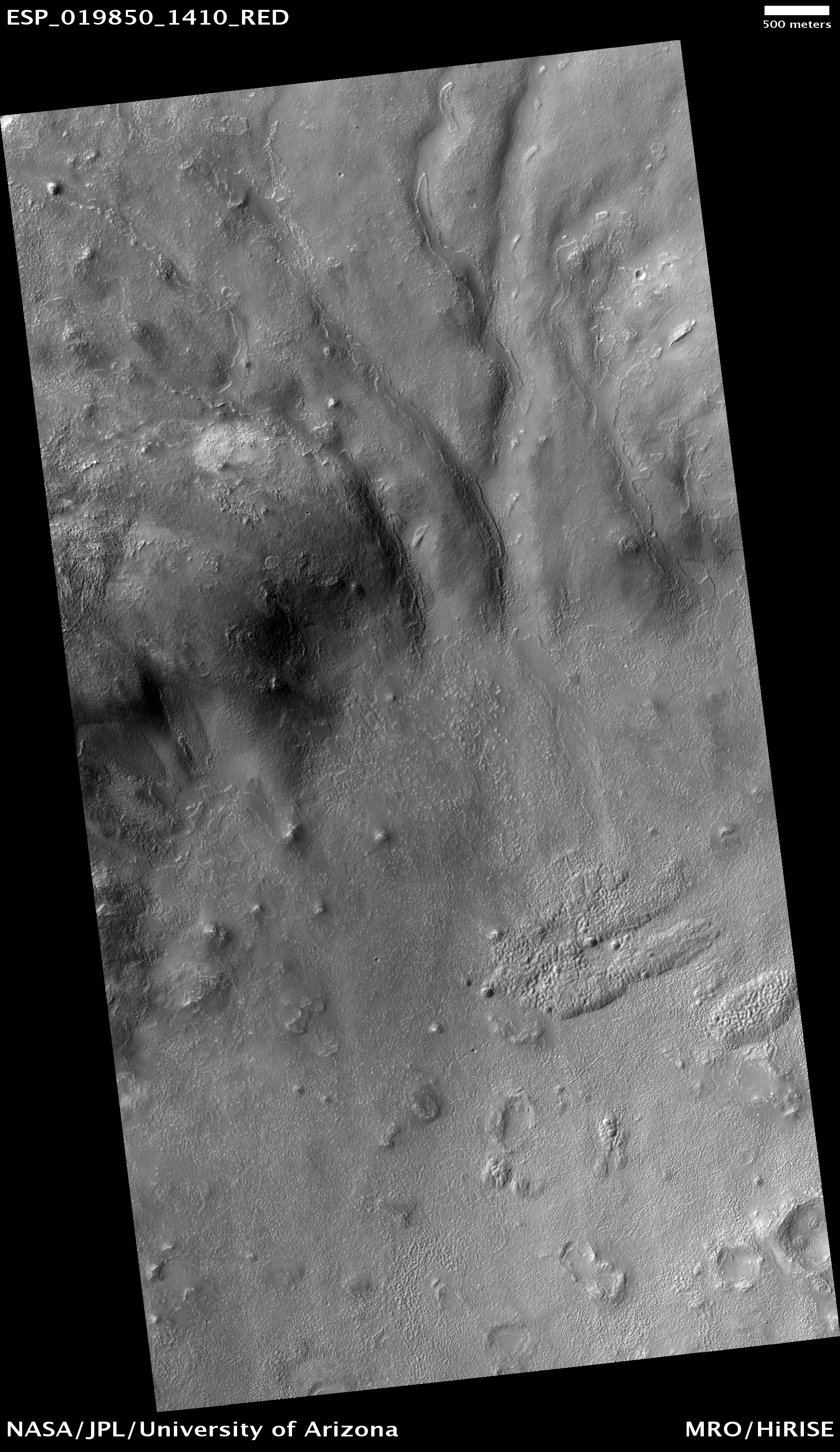
Surface in Argyre quadrangle as seen by HiRISE, under the HiWish program. This is the image of the surface from a single HiRISE image. The scale bar at the top is 500 meters long.

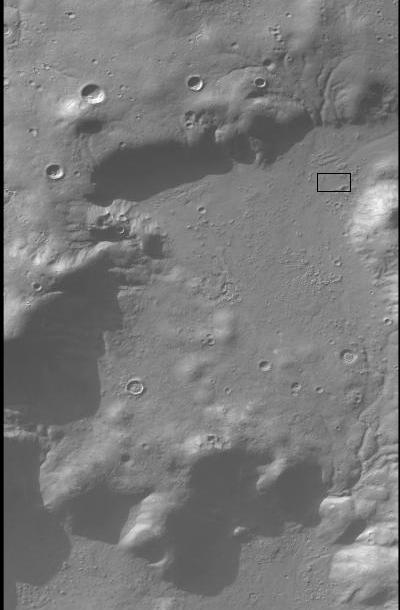
CTX image showing context for the next image. A group of channels are visible in this image.

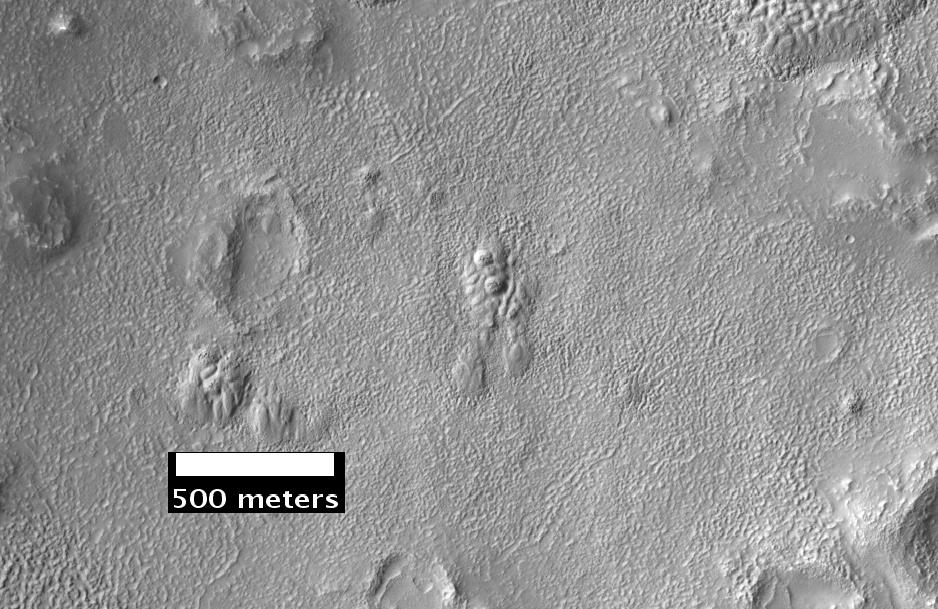
Close-up of surface in Argyre quadrangle, as seen by HiRISE, under the HiWish program

== See also ==
- Argyre quadrangle
- Geography of Mars
- Lakes on Mars
- List of plains on Mars
- Uzboi-Landon-Morava (ULM)
