= Aureum Chaos =

Chaos on Mars

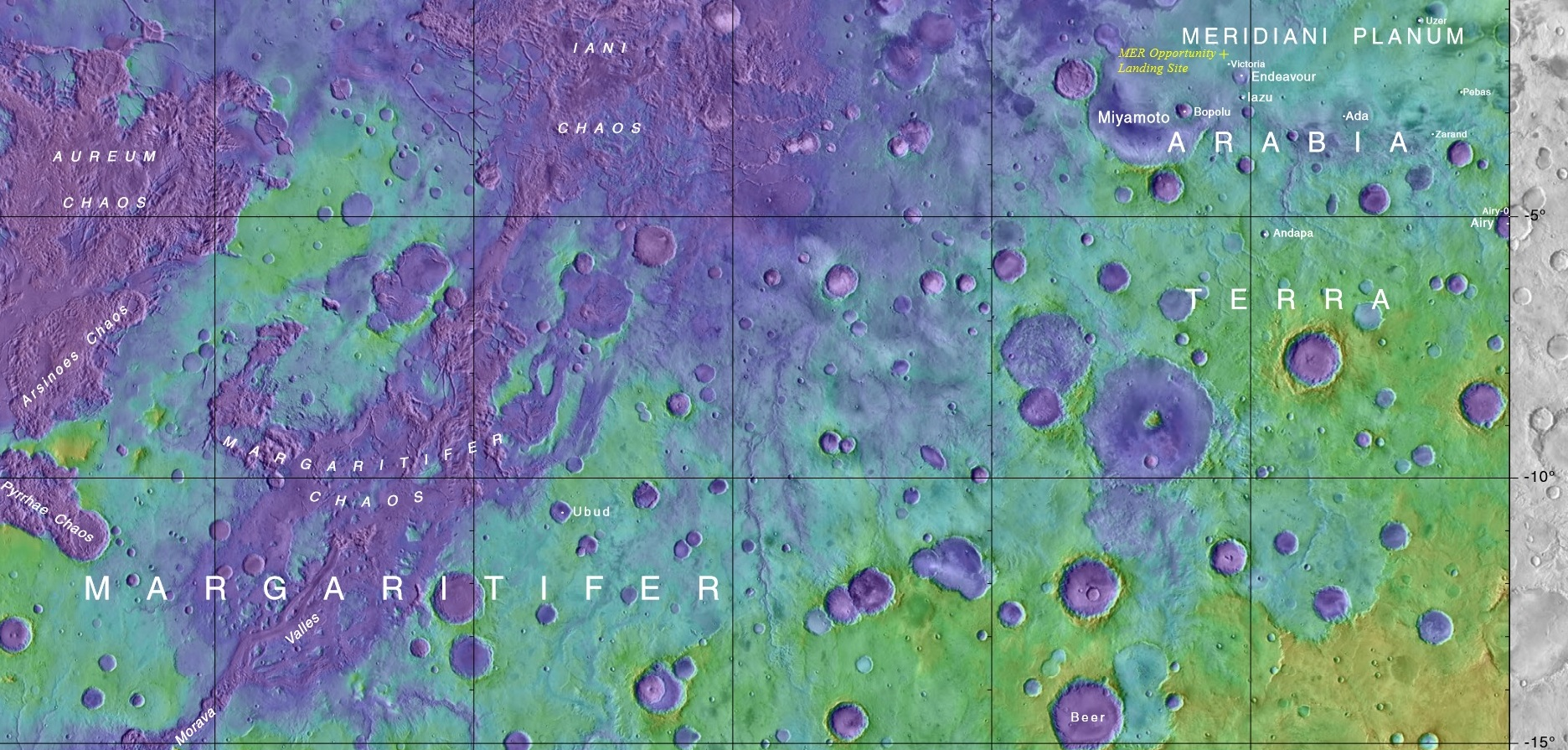
- Map showing location of Aureum Chaos (shown on the far left) along with Arsinoes Chaos (far left), Iani Chaos, Margaritifer Chaos, and other nearby features
- Coordinates: 4.4°S 27°W
- Length: 368 km
- Discoverer: Mariner 9

Aureum Chaos is a rough, collapsed region (chaos terrain) in the Margaritifer Sinus quadrangle (MC-19) portion of the planet Mars at approximately 4.4° south latitude and 27° west longitude, it is also in the west of Margaritifer Terra. It is 368 km across and was named after a classical albedo feature name.

The classic name came from one of the first maps of Mars drawn by Schiaparelli. He called a feature "Aurea Cherso, which translates to the golden peninsula—an ancient name for Malaya. Aureum is the Latin word for gold. In chemistry, the symbol for gold is Au from gold's Latin name.

== Description ==
Aureum Chaos is a major canyon system and collapsed area. The canyons are about 1 km deep. Large outflow channels on Mars are believed to be caused by catastrophic discharges of ground water. Many of the channels begin in chaotic terrain, where the ground has apparently collapsed. In the collapsed section, blocks of undisturbed material can be seen. The OMEGA experiment on Mars Express discovered clay minerals (phyllosilicates) in a variety places in Aureum Chaos. Clay minerals need water to form, so the area may once have contained large amounts of water.

== Gallery ==
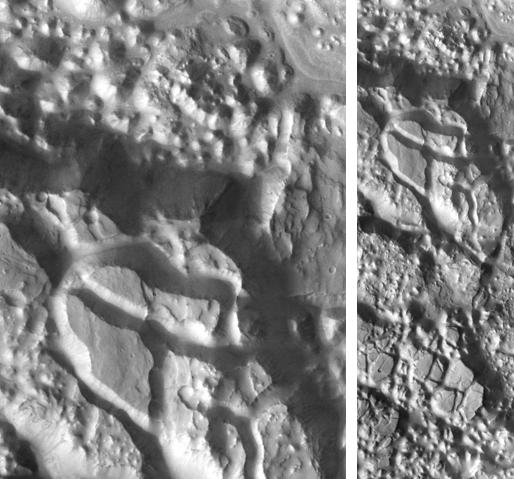
Aureum Chaos, as seen from Themis.

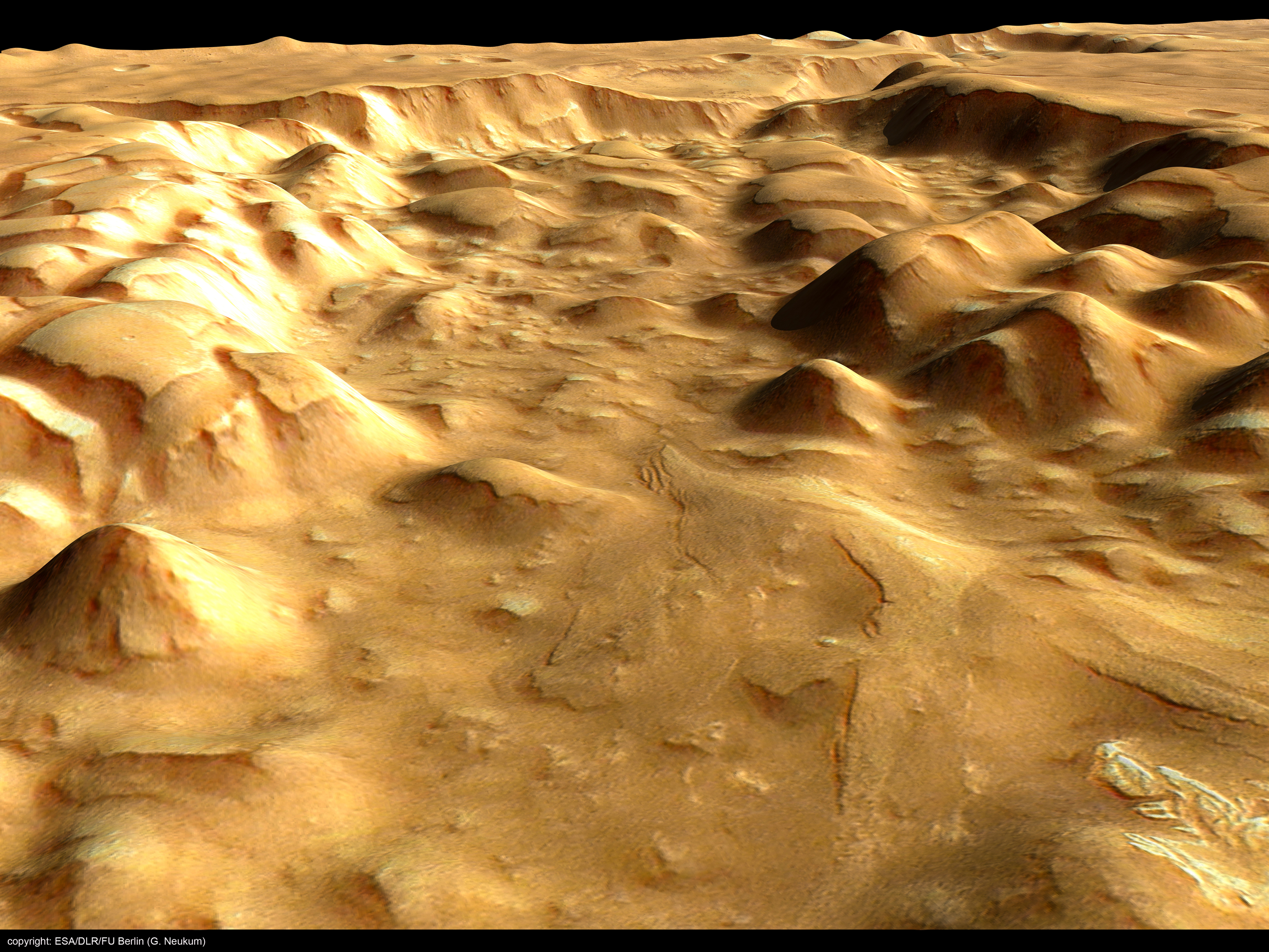
Perspective view of the canyon systems

== See also ==
- List of areas of chaos terrain on Mars
