= Iani Chaos =

Chaos on Mars

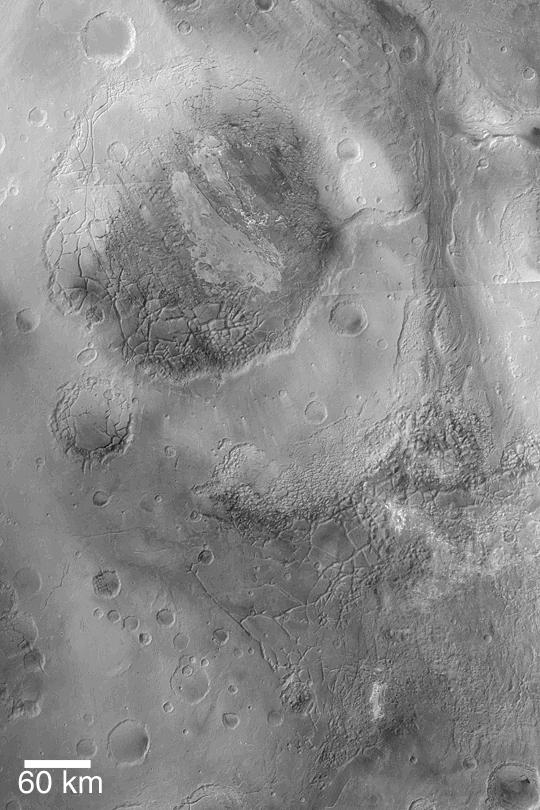
Aram Chaos is the circular depression in the top left. Iani Chaos is in the bottom right.

Iani Chaos is a region of chaos terrain at the south end of the outflow channel Ares Vallis, of the Margaritifer Sinus quadrangle (MC-19) region of the planet Mars, centered at approximately ~342°E, 2°S. This is the source region of Ares Vallis. The chaotic terrain is widely believed to have formed via the removal of subsurface water or ice, resulting in flooding at the surface, and the formation of Ares Vallis. Within Iani Chaos, deposited stratigraphically above the chaotic terrain, are smooth, low-slope, intermediate-to-light-toned deposits that are rich in a hydrated mineral that is most likely gypsum as well as hematite.

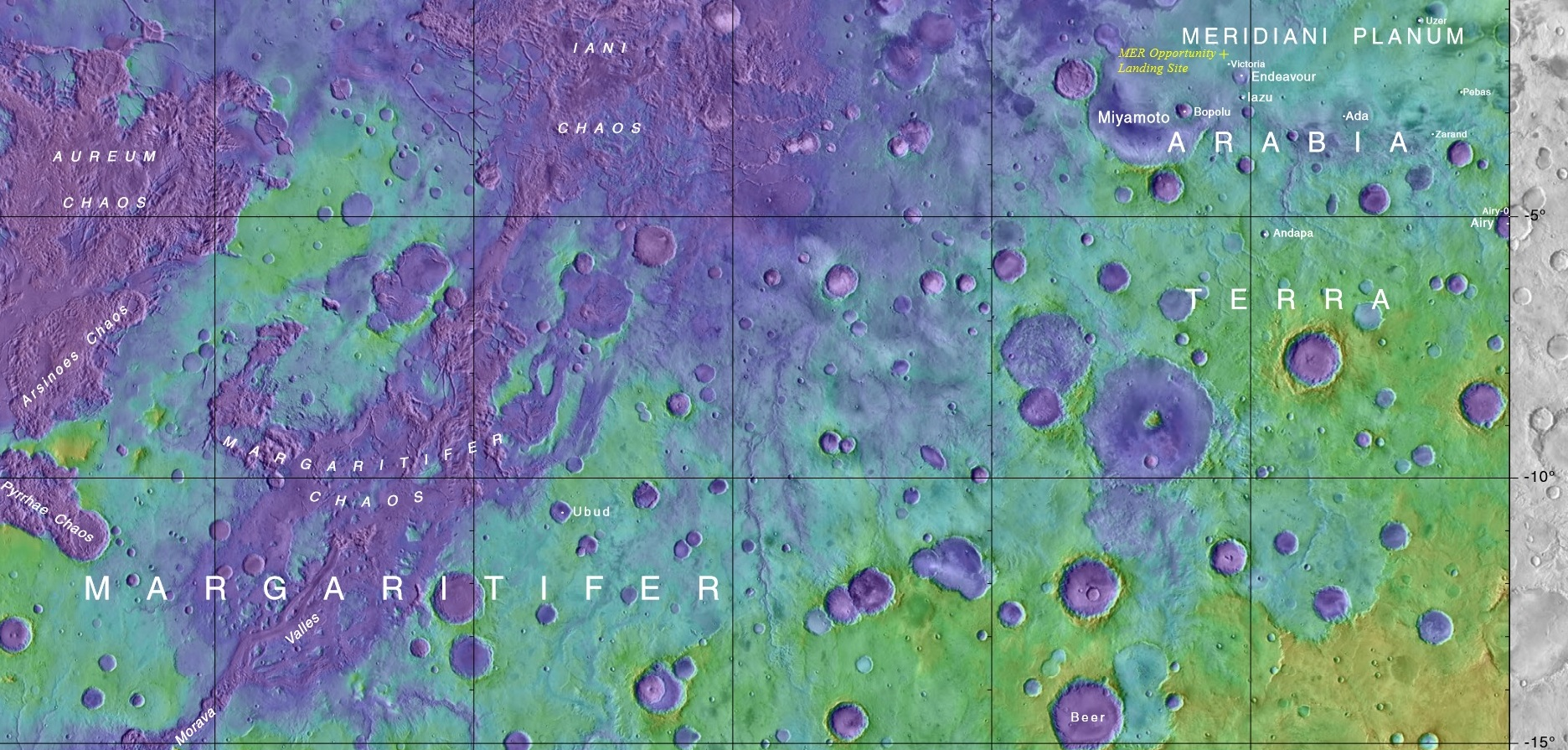
Map showing location of Arsinoes Chaos (far left), Iani Chaos, Aureum Chaos, Margaritifer Chaos, and other nearby features

== Mars Science Laboratory ==
Several sites in the Margaritifer Sinus quadrangle have been proposed as areas to send NASA's next major Mars rover, the Mars Science Lab. Among the top 33 landing sites was Iani Chaos. A picture below shows a potential landing zone in Iani Chaos. Deposits of hematite and gypsum have been found there. Those minerals are usually formed in connection with water.

The aim of the Mars Science Laboratory is to search for signs of ancient life. It is hoped that a later mission could then return samples from sites identified as probably containing remains of life. To safely bring the craft down, a 12-mile-wide, smooth, flat circle is needed. Geologists hope to examine places where water once ponded. They would like to examine sediment layers.

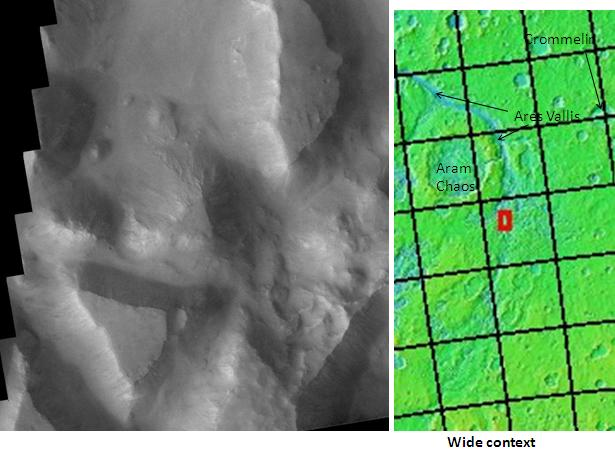
Iani Chaos, as seen by THEMIS. Sand from eroding mesas is covering brighter floor material. Click on image to see relationship of Iani Chaos to other local features.

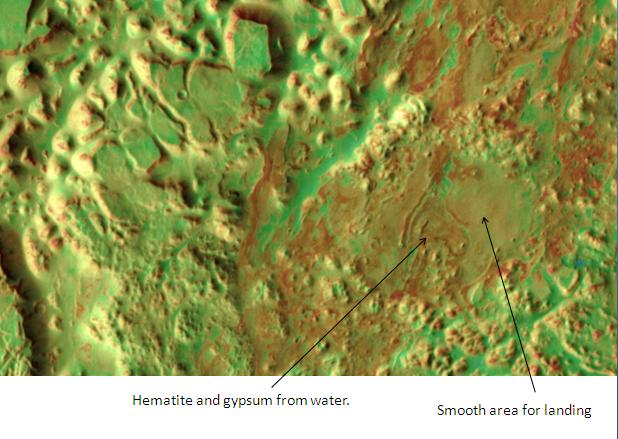
Landing zone in Iani Chaos, as seen by THEMIS.

== See also ==
- Aram Chaos
- Ares Vallis
- Chaos terrain
- Geology of Mars
- List of areas of chaos terrain on Mars
- Mars
- Martian chaos terrain
- Outflow channels
