= Martian chaos terrain =

Irregular groups of large blocks of rock

The planet Mars has distinctive areas of chaos terrain, a topography unlike any on Earth. Chaos terrain generally consists of irregular groups of large blocks, some reaching tens of kilometers across and a hundred or more meters high. The tilted and flat topped blocks form depressions hundreds of metres deep. A chaotic region can be recognized by a rat's nest of mesas, buttes, and hills, chopped through with valleys which in places look almost patterned. Some parts of this chaotic area have not collapsed completely—they are still formed into large mesas, so they may still contain water ice. Chaos regions formed long ago. By counting craters (more craters in any given area means an older surface) and by studying the valleys' relations with other geological features, scientists have concluded the channels formed 2.0 to 3.8 billion years ago.

== Locations ==
The greatest concentrations of chaotic terrain are in the same locations as giant, ancient river valleys. Because so many large channels seem to originate from chaotic terrain, it is widely believed that chaos terrain is caused by water coming out of the ground in the form of massive floods. Most of the chaotic terrain exists in the highlands of Mars, south of Chryse Planitia, in the Oxia Palus quadrangle, and along the Martian dichotomy. But some chaos regions can be found in Margaritifer Sinus quadrangle, Phaethontis quadrangle, and Lunae Palus quadrangle.

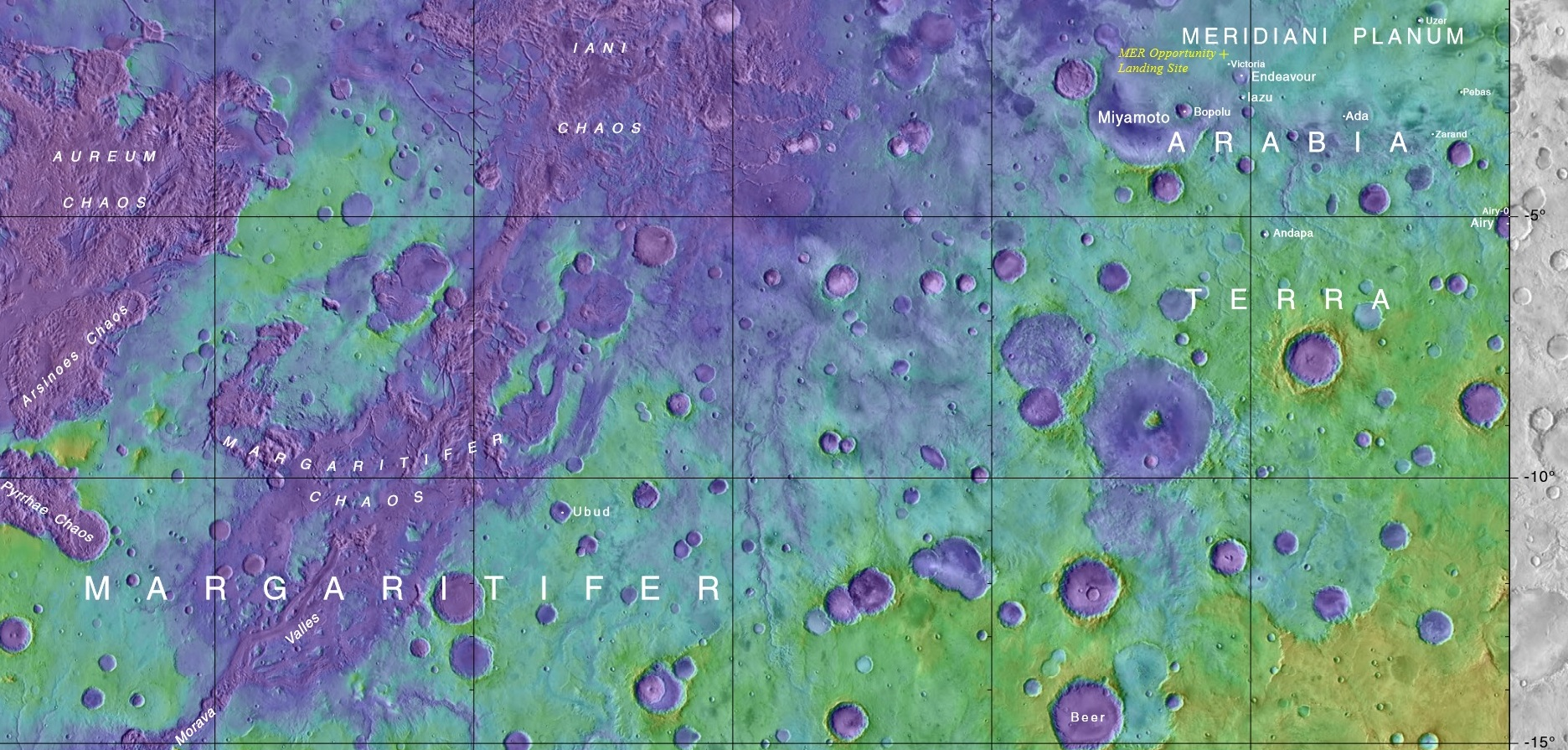
Map showing location of Arsinoes Chaos (far left), Iani Chaos, Aureum Chaos, Margaritifer Chaos, and other nearby features

== Theories for formation ==
Many different theories have been advanced for how floods of water came to be released with the formation of chaotic terrain. Evidence for the involvement of water has been found—minerals associated with water, such as grey, crystalline hematite and phyllosilicates, are present in chaos regions. Many explanations for the creation of chaos involve the sudden melting of giant reservoirs of ground ice. Some researchers have suggested that a frozen layer, called a cryosphere, developed over a long time period and then something triggered it to rupture and melt suddenly. The rupturing event may have been impacts, magma movements, seismic activity, volcanic tectonic strains, increased pore pressure, or the dissociation of clathrates. A clathrate composed of carbon dioxide and methane could have explosively dissociated, thereby liquefying water-saturated sediments. A variation of this idea of a cryosphere is that an aquifer was created along with the cryosphere. As more and more ice was added resulting in a thicker cryosphere, the water in the aquifer became pressurized. When something like an impact or movement of magma broke or melted the cryosphere, floods of water under great pressure were released. However, further calculations showed that the great channels could not have been produced with just a single discharge. Later proposals advanced the notion that the geological shapes present in chaos regions could have been made by a series of over 100 flooding events.

=== Melting of buried ice ===
More recently, researchers have suggested ways for the formation of chaos without the need for a special triggering event. Tanja Zegers and others calculated that the simple burial of ice-rich sediments could result in the release of huge amounts of water leading to the formation of the large river basins that are associated with most chaos terrains. The group studied Aram Chaos, a large region of chaos that probably began as a large impact crater. In their model, ice-rich material accumulated in the crater and then became covered with sediment, which prevented the ice from disappearing into the thin atmosphere. Eventually, the heat from the deep subsurface together with the insulating qualities of the covering layer produced a thick water layer. Since dense materials tend to sink into water, the overlying rock broke under the strain. The dense, rocky cap fractured into various sized, tilted blocks. The melt water went to the top and made a channel which eroded more and more as water rushed outward. Along with water from other chaotic regions, there would have been enough erosive force to carve the large river valleys we now observe. There is ample evidence for buried deposits of ice in the form of glaciers, preserved under a thin covering of rock and dirt.

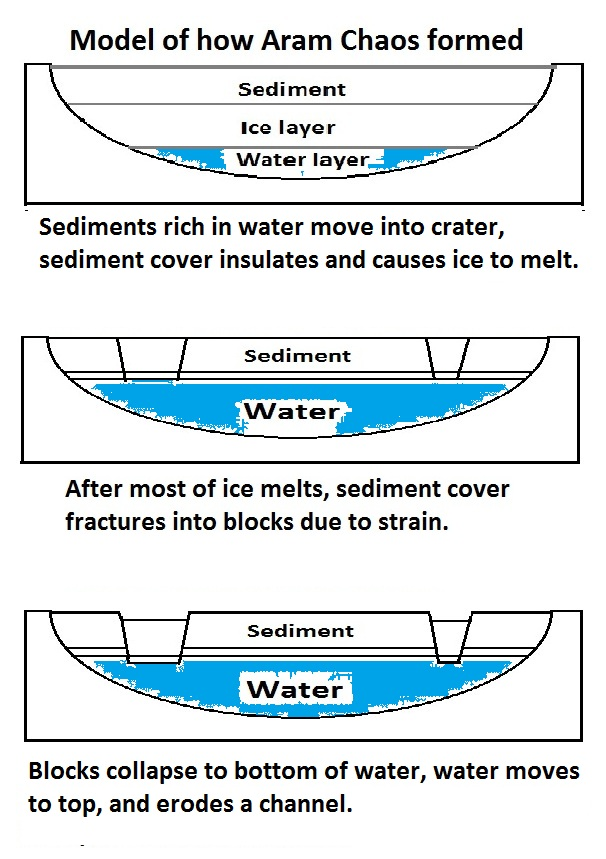
These drawings show stages in the formation of Aram chaos and probably many other chaotic terrains according to a model advanced by Zegers et al. 2010. Click on images to see more details.

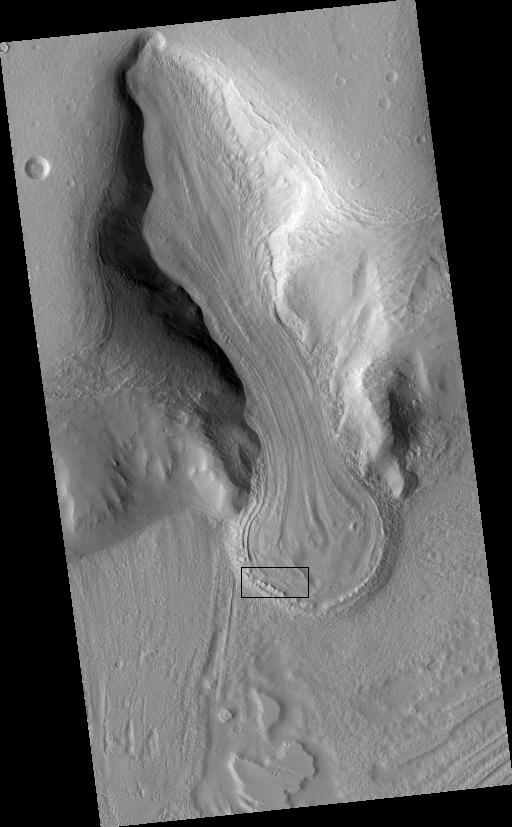
Glacier as seen by HiRISE under the HiWish program. Area in rectangle is enlarged in the next photo. Zone of accumulation of snow at the top. Glacier is moving down valley, then spreading out on plain. Evidence for flow comes from the many lines on surface. Location is in Protonilus Mensae in Ismenius Lacus quadrangle.

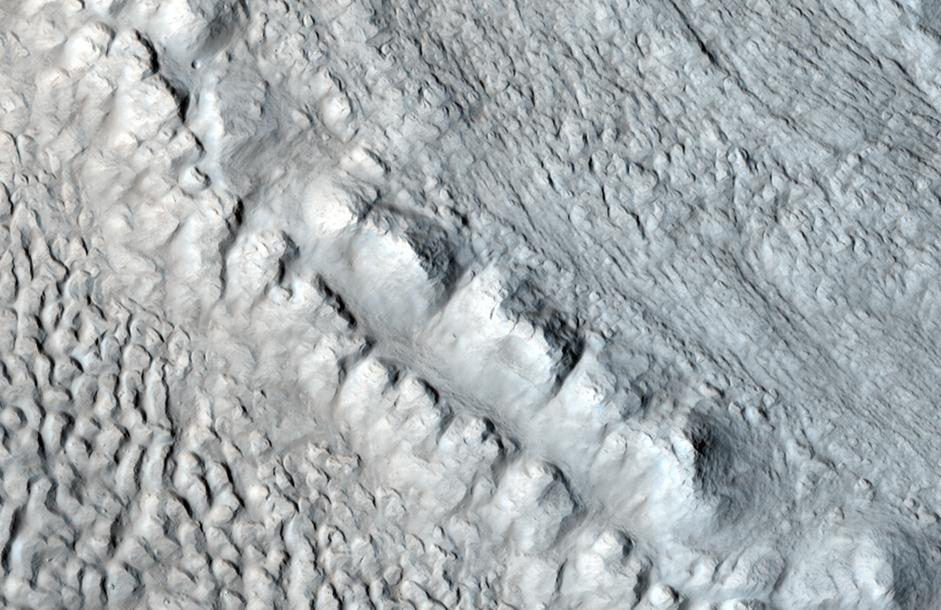
Enlargement of area in rectangle of the previous image. On Earth the ridge would be called the terminal moraine of an alpine glacier. Picture taken with HiRISE under the HiWish program. Image from Ismenius Lacus quadrangle.

It also seems that Mars has had many ice ages in which ice was deposited, then later buried. These ice ages are caused by the frequent large changes in the tilt of the planet. The tilt of the spin axis of Mars is highly variable due to the lack of a large moon. Observations of many craters have shown that many craters are mostly full of sediments—ice could be one of the sediments. Many craters appear to be very shallow, but observations of younger craters have demonstrated that impact craters start out as sort of bowl shaped; hence a crater that today looks shallow has probably been filled with sediments. Research, published by Rodriguez and others in 2005, suggested that the subsurface of Mars contains an accumulation of old craters that may be filled with water or ice.

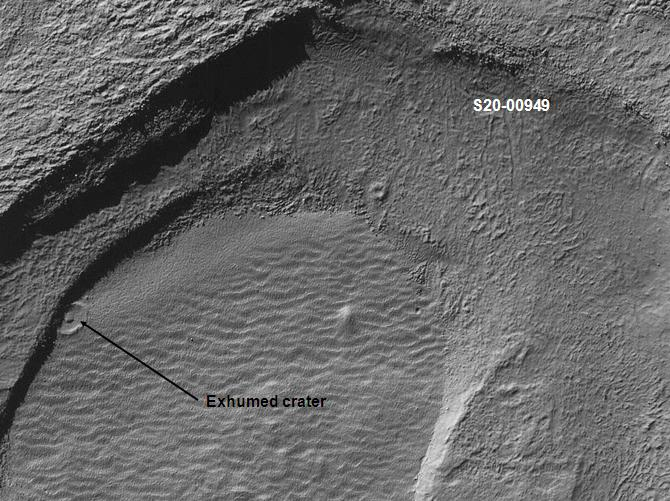
Crater that was buried in another age and is now being exposed by erosion, as seen by the Mars Global Surveyor. This is evidence that there may be many buried craters in the subsurface of Mars.

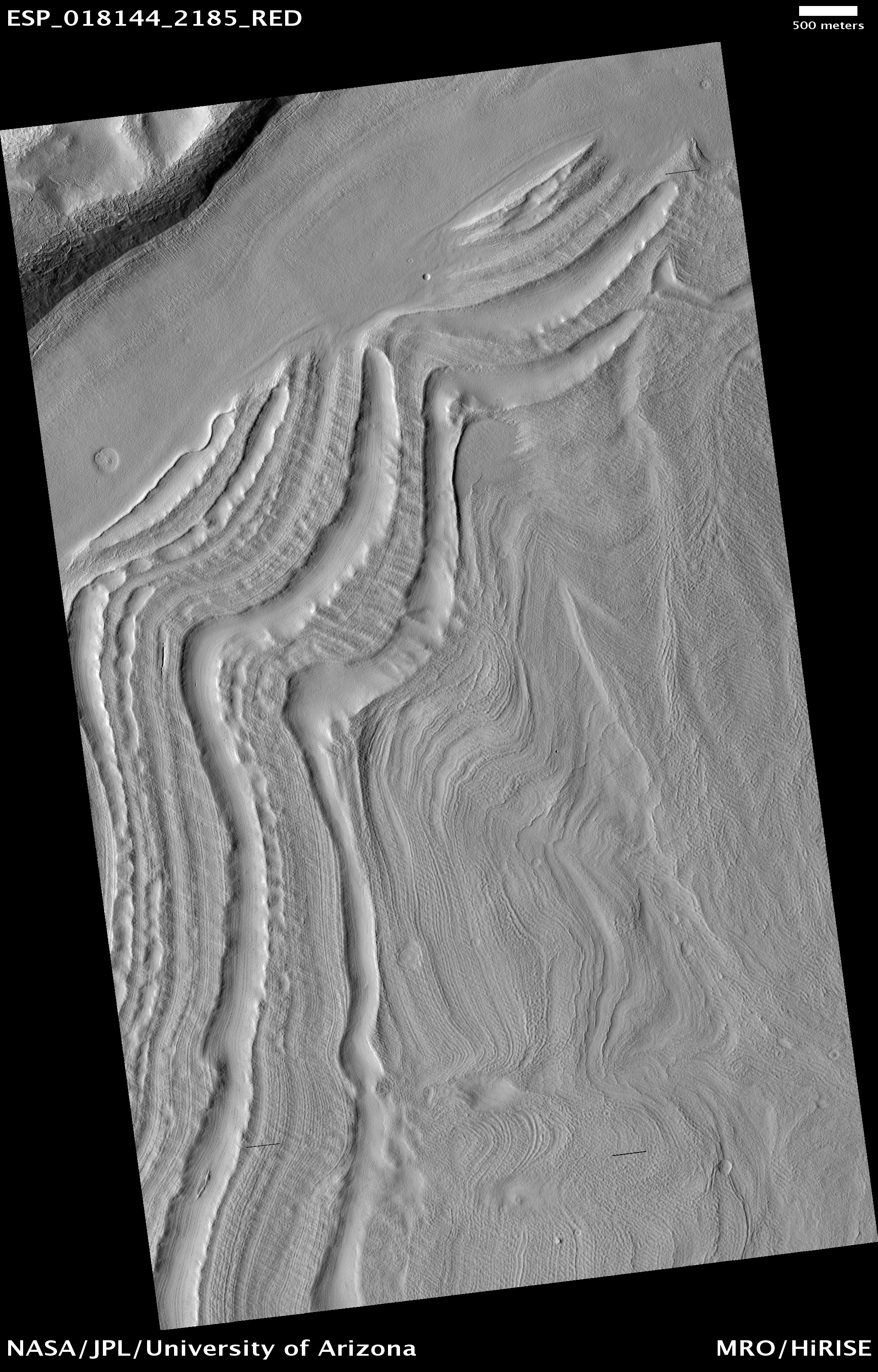
Well-developed hollows, as seen by HiRISE under the HiWish program. Hollows are on floor of a crater with concentric crater fill. The hollows develop because of movements of ice-rich sediment. There may be hundreds of metres of ice covered by a thin layer of sediments. Location is Casius quadrangle.

=== Sublimation of an ice-rich layer ===
Some regions of chaos may have been produced by another means. Galaxias Chaos is different from many other chaotic regions. It does not have associated outflow channels, and it does not display a great elevation difference between it and the surrounding land area, as most of the other chaos regions. Research by Pedersen and Head, published in 2010, suggests that Galaxias Chaos is the site of a volcanic flow that buried an ice-rich layer, called the Vastitas Borealis Formation (VBF). It is generally believed that the VBF is a residue from water-rich materials deposited by large floods. The VBF may have been of varied thickness and may have contained varied amounts of ice. In the thin atmosphere of Mars, this layer would have slowly disappeared by sublimation (changing from a solid directly to a gas). Since some areas would have sublimated more than others, the upper lava cap would not be supported evenly and would crack. Cracks/troughs may have begun from sublimation and shrinkage along the edges of the lava cap. Stress from the undermining of the cap edge would have made cracks in the cap. Places with cracks would undergo more sublimation, then the cracks would widen and form the blocky terrain characteristic of regions of chaos. The sublimation process may have been aided by heat (geothermal flux) from magma movements. There are volcanoes, namely Elysium Montes and Hecates Tholus, nearby which most likely are surrounded by dikes, which would have heated the ground. Also, a warmer period in the past would have increased the amount of water sublimating from the ground.

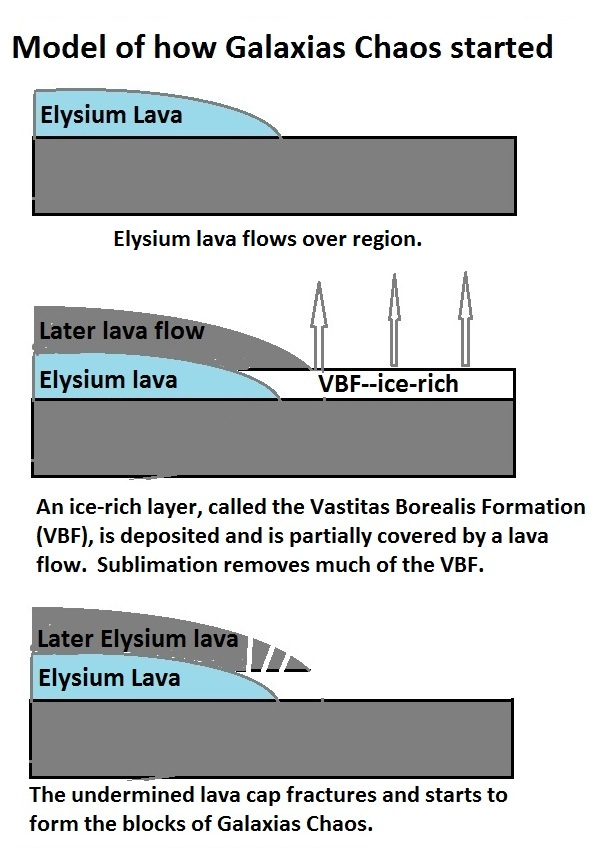
This series of drawings show another model for the formation of Martian chaos, as proposed by Pedersen and Head 2011 Amount of sublimation is exaggerated to improve understanding. Click on image to see more details.

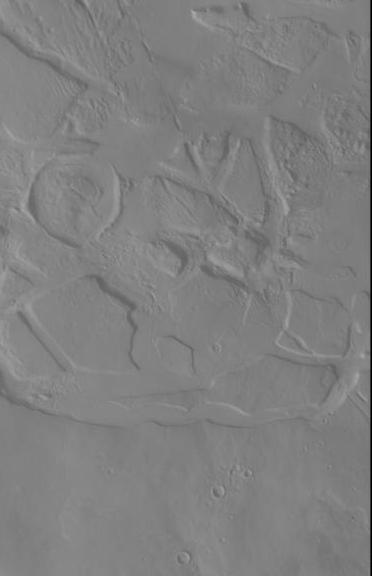
Galaxias Chaos as seen by CTX. The scene in the next image is a part of this picture.

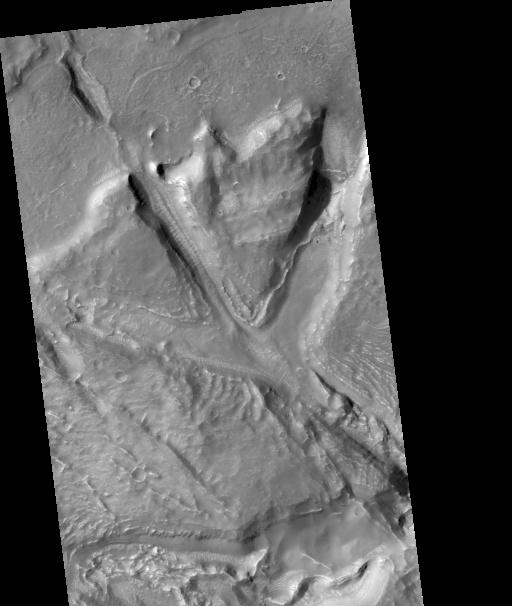
Galaxias Chaos as seen by HiRISE.

== Importance ==
Chaos terrain seems to be strong evidence for large amounts of water flowing on Mars in the past. Some of the terrain is not totally broken up, so perhaps more water exists frozen inside some of the blocks.

== Gallery ==
=== Chaos regions in Margaritifer Sinus quadrangle ===
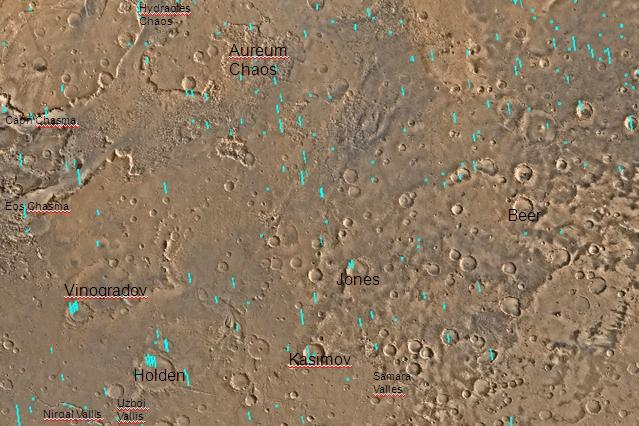
Map of Margaritifer Sinus quadrangle with major features labeled. Aureum Chaos is near the top of the map.

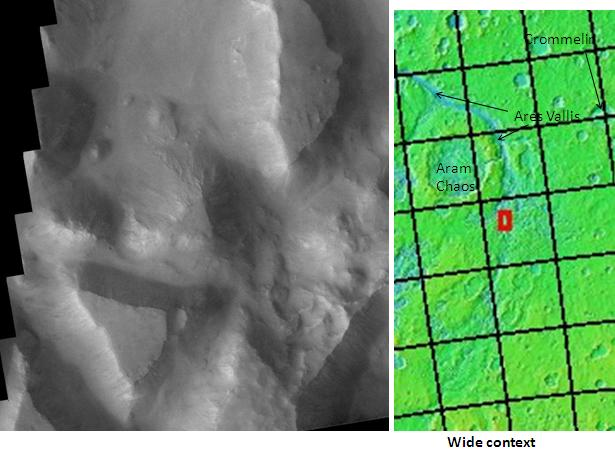
Iani Chaos, as seen by THEMIS. Sand from eroding mesas is covering brighter floor material. Click on image to see relationship of Iani Chaos to other local features. Image from Margaritifer Sinus quadrangle.

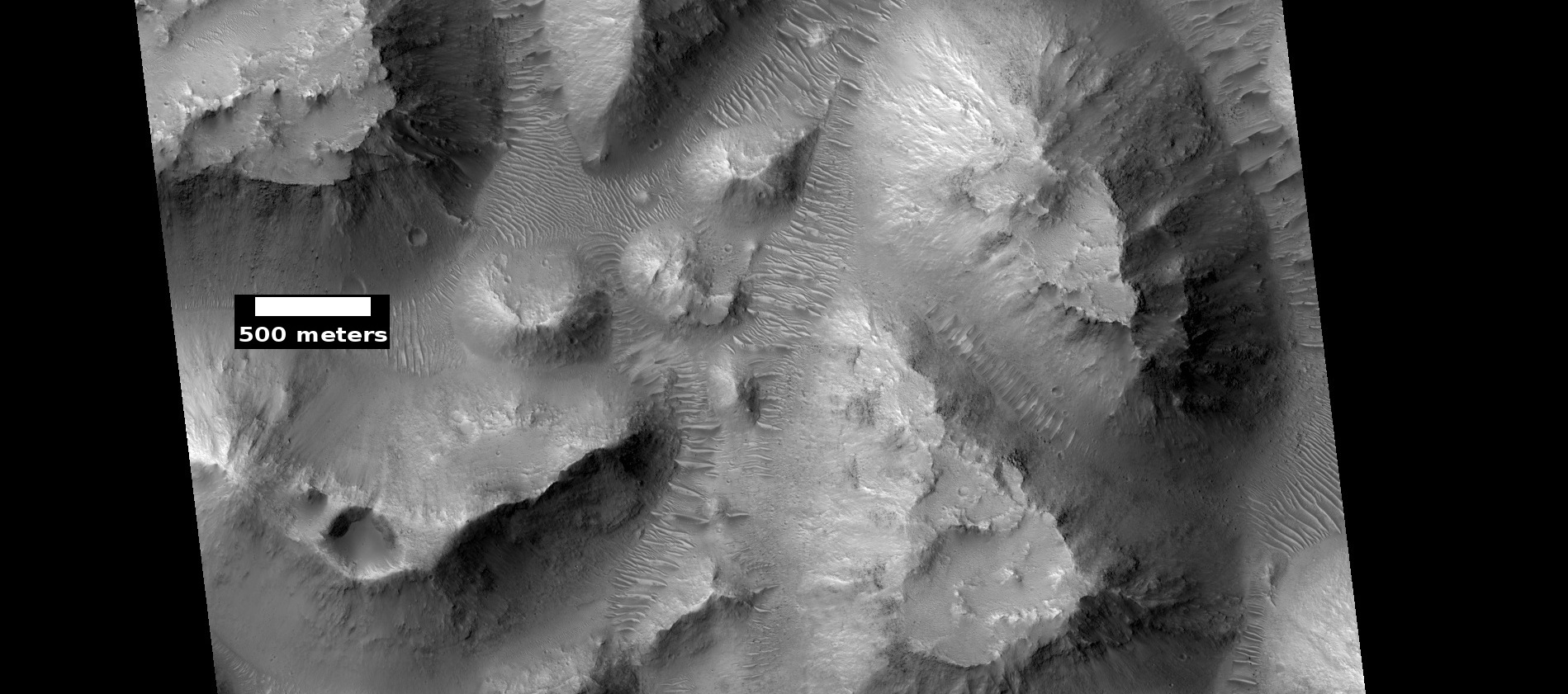
Chaos terrain, as seen by HiRISE under HiWish program Location is Margaritifer Sinus quadrangle

=== Chaos regions in Oxia Palus quadrangle ===
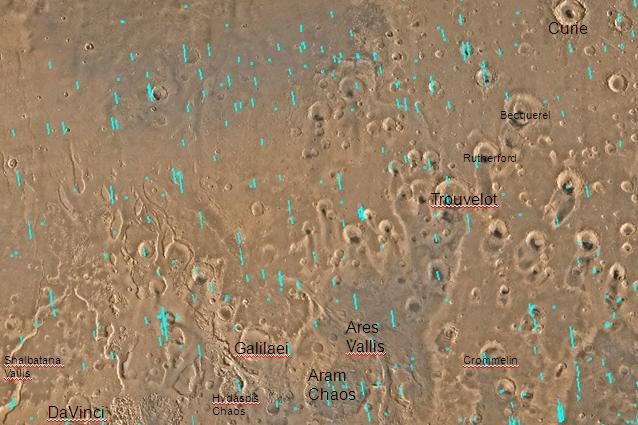
Quadrangle map of Oxia Palus labeled with major features. This quadrangle contains many collapsed areas of Chaos and many outflow channels (old river valleys).

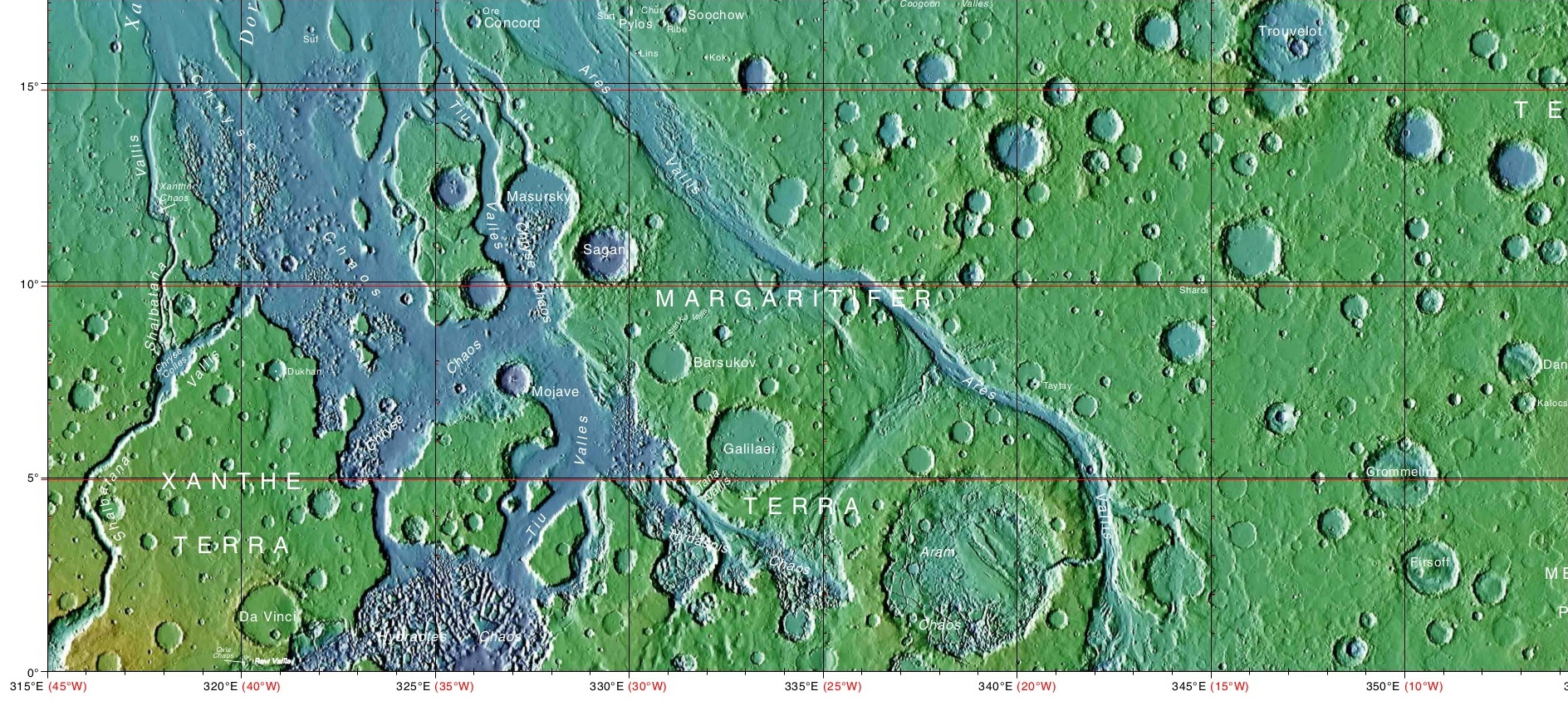
Topographic map of Oxia Palus region of Mars showing the location of a number of chaos regions

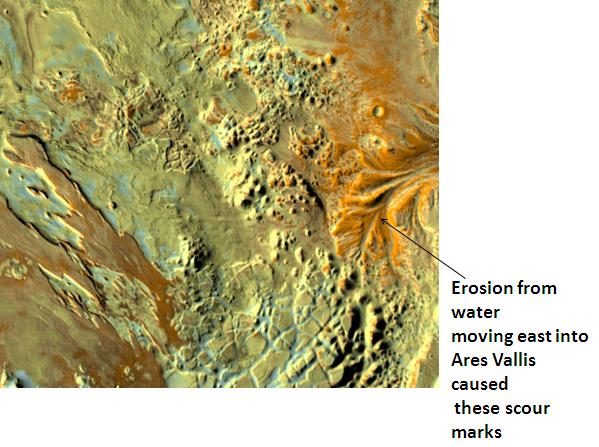
Erosion in Aram Chaos, as seen by THEMIS. Image in Oxia Palus quadrangle.

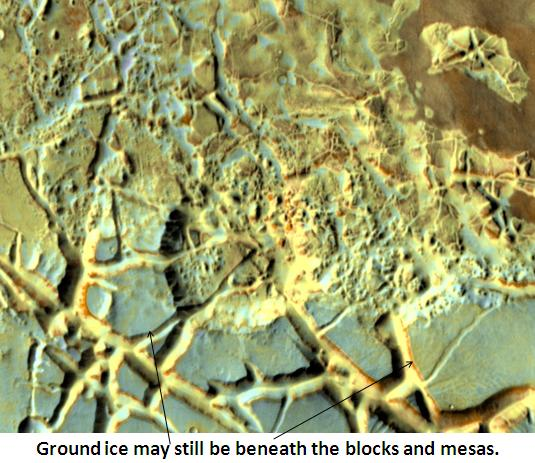
Blocks in Aram showing possible source of water, as seen by THEMIS. Image in Oxia Palus quadrangle.

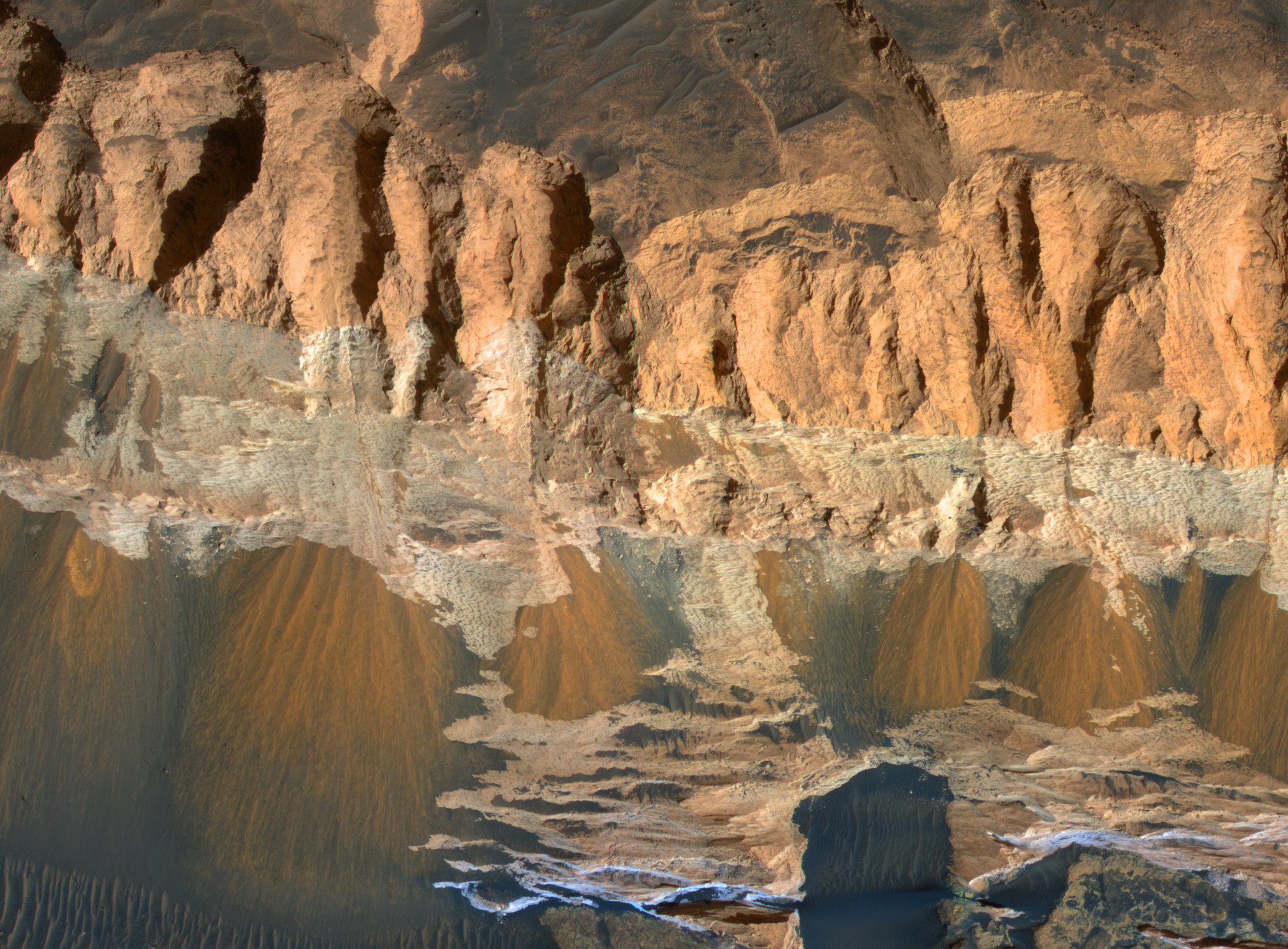
Badlands of Aram Chaos

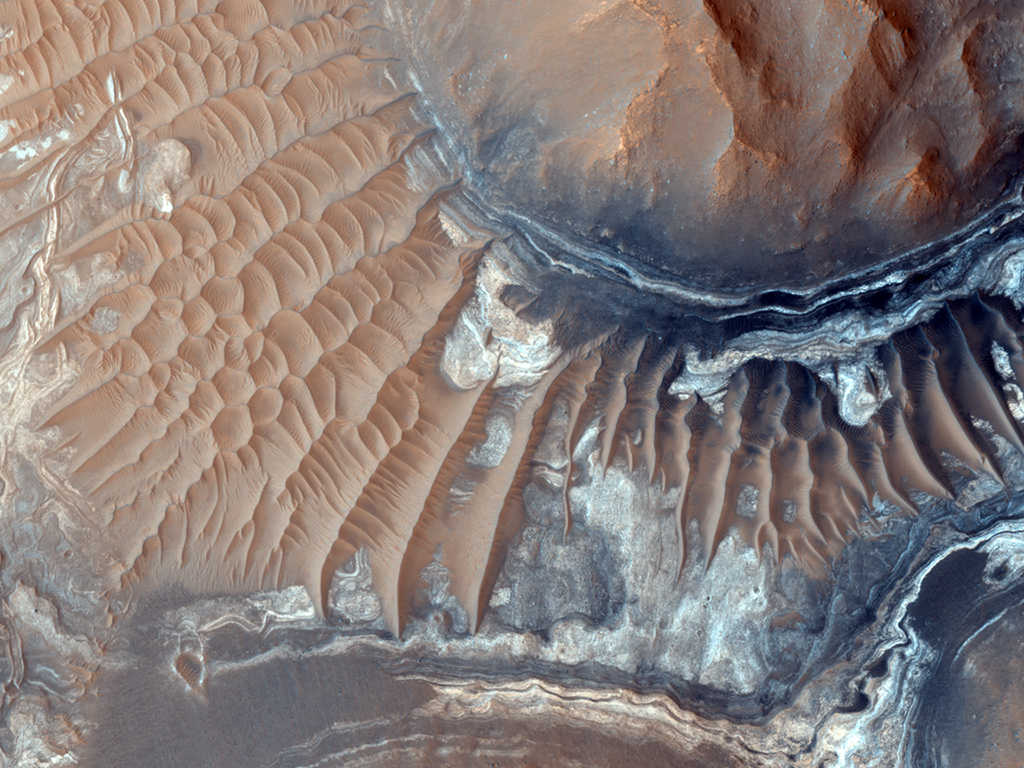
Eastern Floor of Aram Chaos

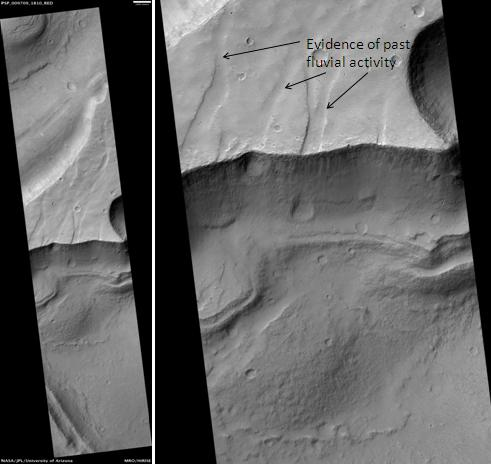
Hydraotes Chaos, as seen by HiRISE. Click on image to see channels and layers. Scale bar is 1000 metres long. Image in Oxia Palus quadrangle.

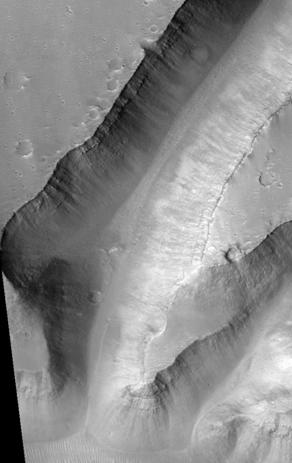
Hydaspis Chaos, as seen by HiRISE. Image in Oxia Palus quadrangle.

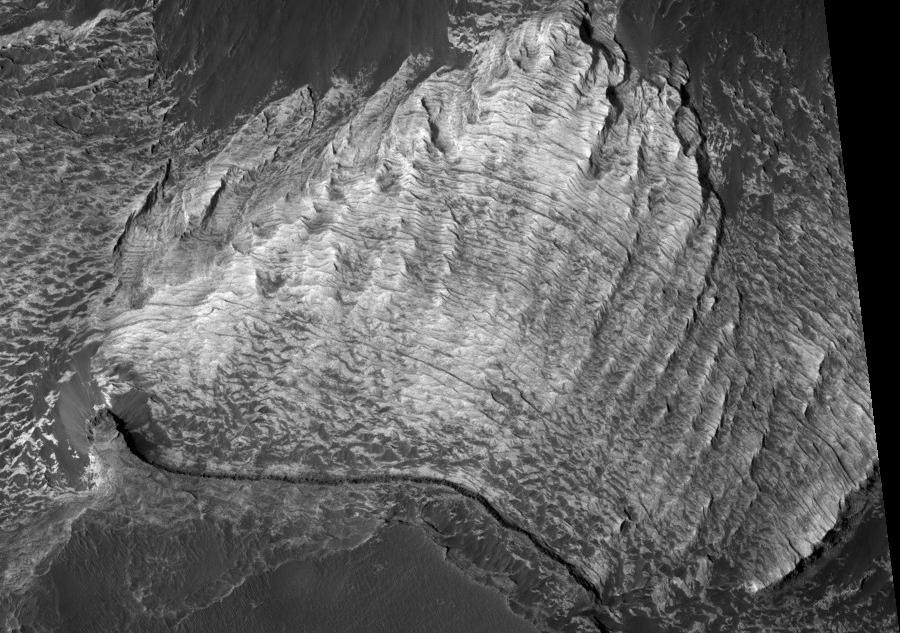
Light coloured layers in Eos Chaos, as seen by HiRISE. Image is in Oxia Palus quadrangle.

=== Chaos regions in Phaethontis quadrangle ===
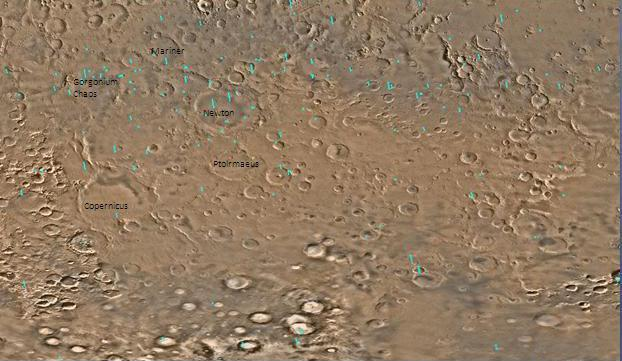
Map of Phaethontis quadrangle. Click on to enlarge and see some crater names. Gorgonum Chaos is near the top of map.

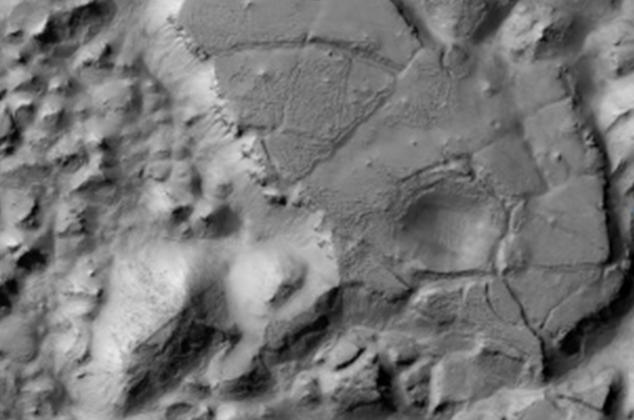
Gorgonum Chaos as seen by Mars Reconnaissance Orbiter HiRISE. Image is 4 km wide. Image in Phaethontis quadrangle.

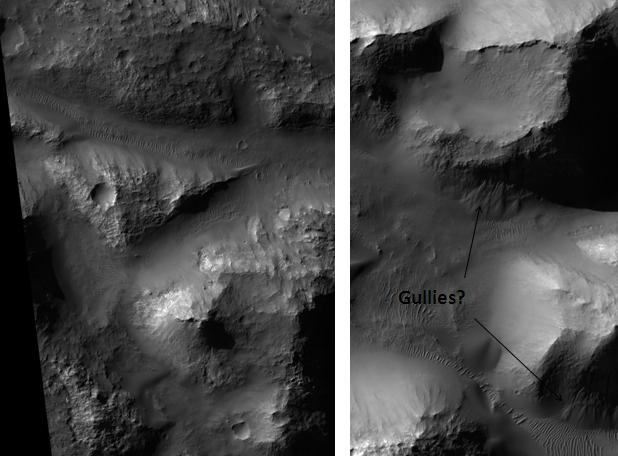
Atlantis Chaos, as seen by HiRISE. Click on image to see mantle covering and possible gullies. The two images are different parts of the original image. They have different scales. Image in Phaethontis quadrangle.

=== Chaos regions in Lunae Palus quadrangle ===
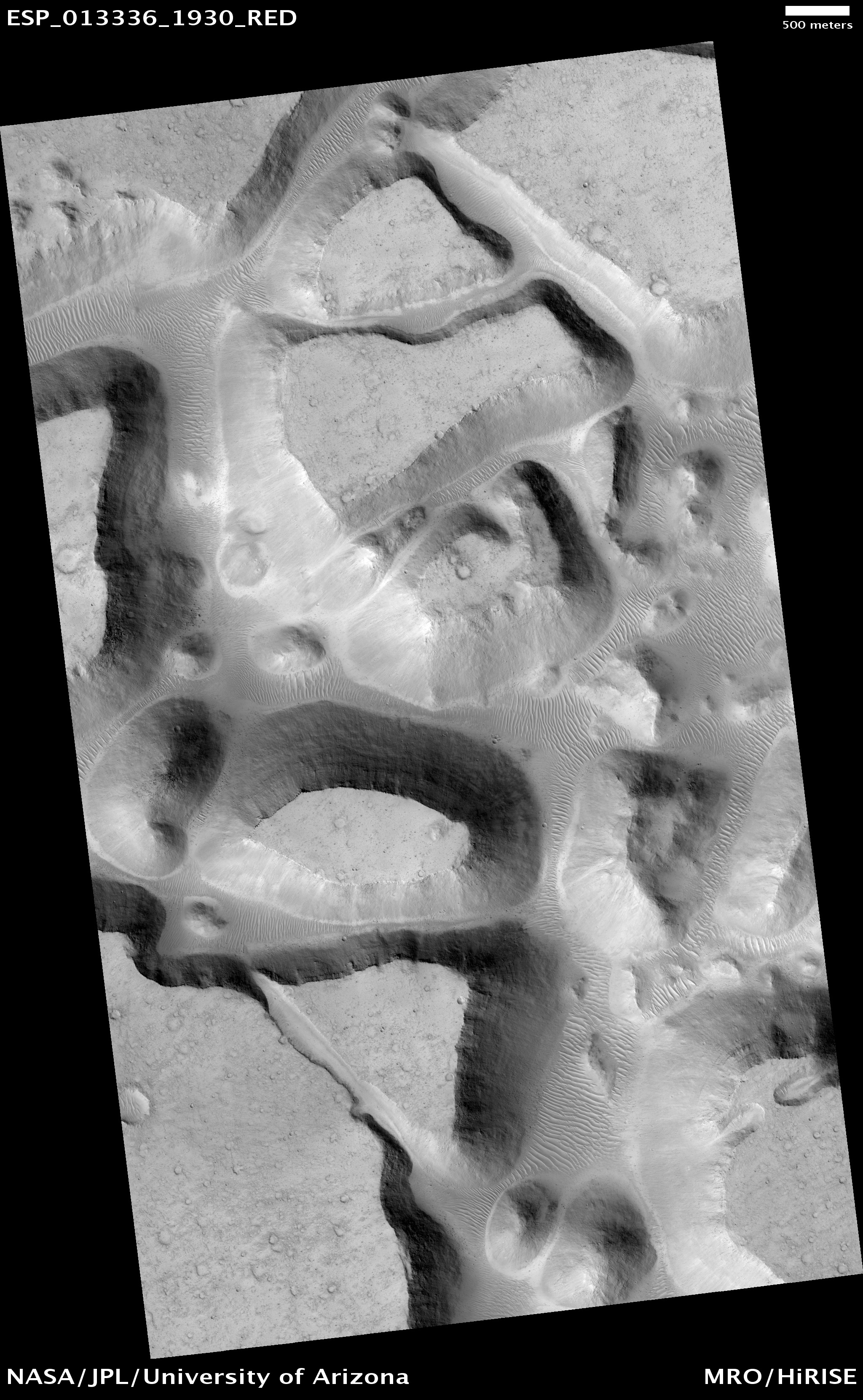
Ister Chaos, as seen by HiRISE. Location is the Lunae Palus quadrangle.

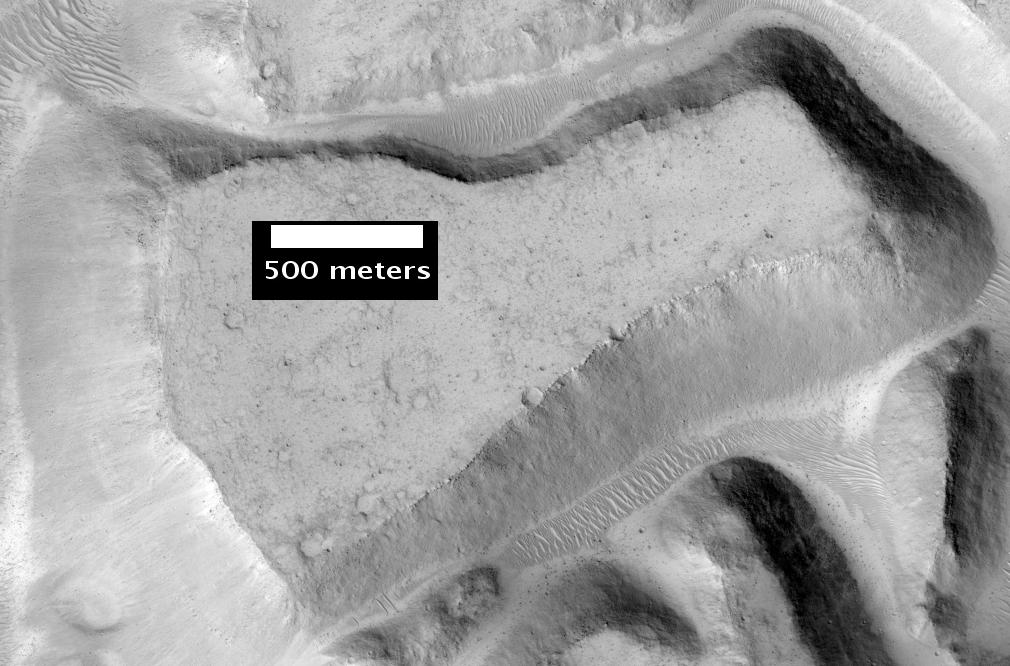
Close-up of Ister Chaos, as seen by HiRISE. Location is the Lunae Palus quadrangle.

On April 1, 2010, NASA released the first images under the HiWish program in which just plain folk suggested places for HiRISE to photograph. One of the eight locations was Aureum Chaos. The first image below gives a wide view of the area. The next two images are from the HiRISE image.

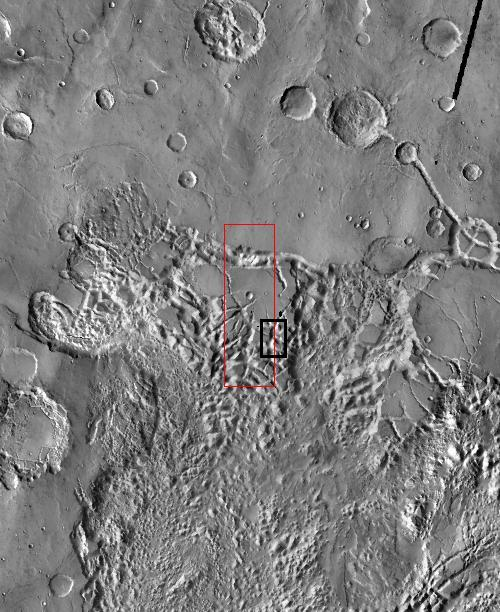
THEMIS image of wide view of following HiRISE images. Black box shows approximate location of HiRISE images. This image is just a part of the vast area known as Aureum Chaos. Click on image to see more details.

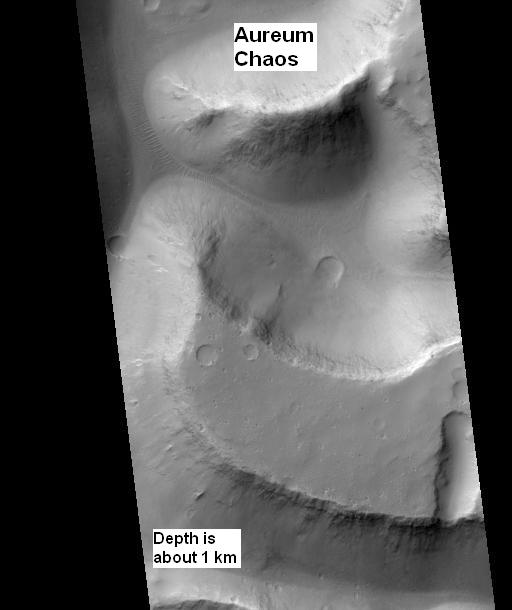
Aureum Chaos, as seen by HiRISE, under the HiWish program.

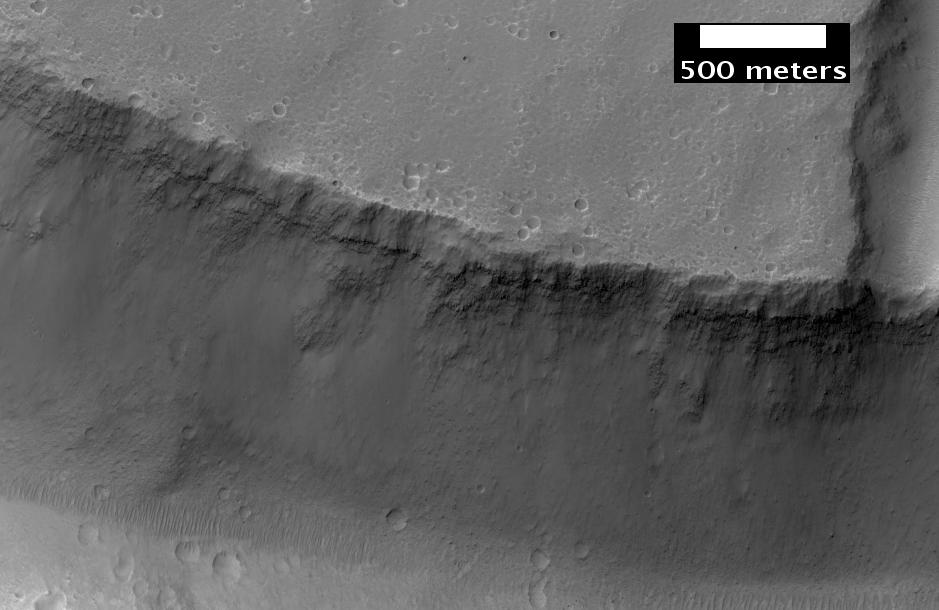
Close up view of previous image, as seen by HiRISE under HiWish program. Small round dots are boulders.

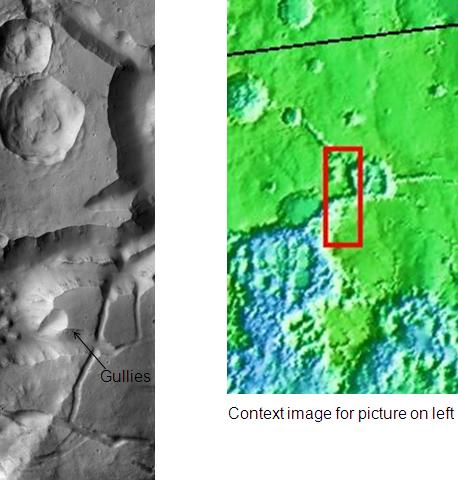
Wide view of huge canyons in Aureum Chaos, as seen by THEMIS. Gullies are rare at this latitude. Image from Margaritifer Sinus quadrangle.

== See also ==
- Chaos terrain – Distinctive area of broken or jumbled terrain
- Climate of Mars
- Geology of Mars – Geology of fourth planet from the Sun
- Galaxias Chaos – Chaos on Mars
- Glacier – Persistent body of ice that moves downhill under its own weight
- Groundwater on Mars – Water held in permeable ground
- Ismenius Lacus quadrangle – Map of Mars
- Margaritifer Sinus quadrangle – One of a series of 30 quadrangle maps of Mars
- Martian dichotomy – Geomorphological feature of Mars
- Outflow channels – Long, wide swathes of scoured ground on Mars
- Water on Mars – Study of past and present water on Mars
