= Aram Chaos =

Crater on Mars

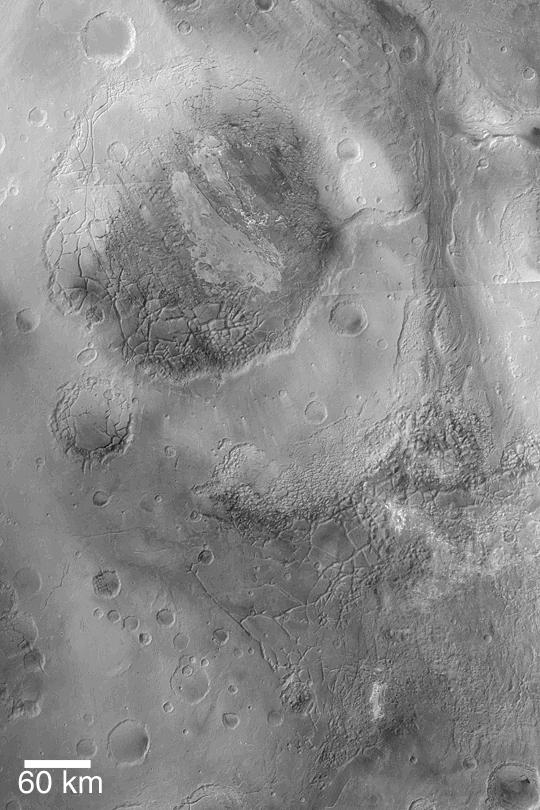
- Aram Chaos is the circular depression in the top left. Iani Chaos is in the bottom right.
- Location: Margaritifer Terra, Mars
- Coordinates: 2.6°N 21.5°W
- Diameter: 280 km (170 mi)
- Depth: 3 km (1.9 mi)

Aram Chaos, centered at 2.6°N, 21.5°W, is a heavily eroded impact crater on Mars. It lies at the eastern end of the large canyon Valles Marineris and close to Ares Vallis. Various geological processes have reduced it to a circular area of chaotic terrain. Aram Chaos takes its name from Aram, one of the classical albedo features observed by Giovanni Schiaparelli, who named it after the Biblical land of Aram. Spectroscopic observation from orbit indicates the presence of the mineral hematite, likely a signature of a once aqueous environment.

== Description ==
Aram Chaos is an impact crater on Mars measuring 280 kilometers (170 mi) in diameter. It lies in the Oxia Palus quadrangle in a region called Margaritifer Terra, and its exact coordinates on Mars are 2.6°N 21.5°W. The Thermal Emission Imaging System (THEMIS) on the orbiter Mars Odyssey found gray crystalline hematite on the floor of Aram Chaos and CRISM, the spectroscope on the MRO, found hydrated sulfates, jarosite, and hematite. The floor of Aram Chaos also contains huge blocks of collapsed, or chaotic, terrain that formed when water or ice was catastrophically removed. Small, shallow outlet channels are also visible in the eastern wall of the impact crater, as well as a small outflow channel connecting Aram Chaos with the Ares Valles outflow channel.

== Geology ==
=== Formation ===
Aram Chaos, as an impact crater, started its formation with the high velocity impact of an unknown smaller body on the surface of Mars. This formed the large, circular depression that originally made up the crater. This crater was then filled with sediments, likely carried by aeolian processes, that were deposited into Aram Chaos over time. Subsequently, and in tandem with the compilation of these sedimentary layers, and aquifer formed beneath the surface of the crater.

==== Chaotic Terrain and Aqueous Environment ====
Following the deposition of sedimentary layers and the formation of the subsurface aquifer, a catastrophic geologic event occurred which caused the release of the subsurface aquifer and the subsequent catastrophic flooding, creating chaotic terrain within Aram Chaos. The repetition of this process led to layered terrains within Aram Chaos, including layers of the mineral hematite. Several minerals in Aram Chaos, including the hematite sulfate minerals and water-altered silicates, suggest that a lake probably once existed within the crater at some point in time. Scientists also suggest that flood channels within Aram Chaos were carved within just weeks or months by catastrophic outflows of groundwater from beneath Aram Chaos and nearby regions. Because forming hematite requires liquid water, which cannot exist without a thick atmosphere, the presence of hematite also suggests that Mars had a much thicker atmosphere at some time in the past. Tilting and erosion of Aram Chaos is also evident in satellite imagery taken of the crater.

==== Possible Volcanic Constructs ====
There is a possible volcanic component to the formation of outflow channels in Aram Chaos. By melting the permafrost or ground ice originally in the crater, geothermal activity may have caused the creation of the visible outflow channels in the impact crater. High resolution MOC images of the chaotic terrains in Aram Chaos show possible volcanic features within the crater, including hills resembling volcanoes, possible magmatic intrusions within the older rock layers, and possible volcanic ash deposits on the crater floor.

=== Mineralogical Composition ===
Not including dust and regolith common on the surface of Mars, two distinct sections of identifiable minerals have been determined to exist within Aram Chaos: a mixture of hematite and/or goethite and a mixture of ferric oxides and sulfates. Specifically, these minerals can be seen as two layers in Aram Chaos, described from top to bottom. The first layer consists mostly of nanophase iron oxides, which is about 250–500 meters thick, while the second layer is made up of a less than 500 m layer of polyhydrated sulfate and hematite.

Ferric hydroxysulfate (Fe3+SO4OH) has been found in Aram Chaos. It was probably formed from the heating and oxidation of hydrated ferrous sulfates. The heat may have come from the deposition of lava or ash. Another psossibility is that heat came from the ground by way of hydrothermal processes. This iron and sulfur compound was discovered with the Compact Reconnaissance Imaging Spectrometer for Mars (CRISM) instrument.

== See also ==
- Chaos terrain
- Geology of Mars
- HiRISE
- HiWish program
- List of areas of chaos terrain on Mars
- Martian chaos terrain
- Outflow channels
- Water on Mars

== More Images ==
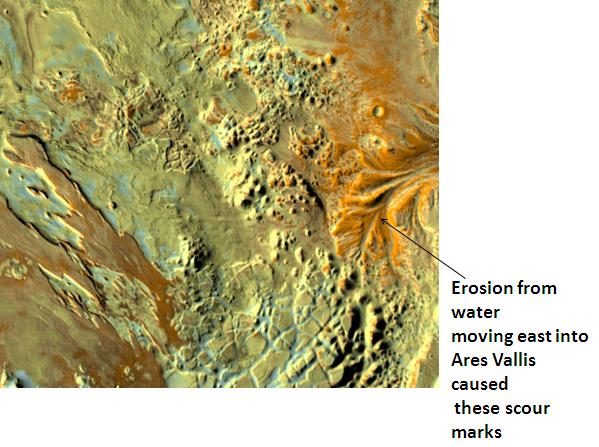
Erosion in Aram Chaos, as seen by THEMIS

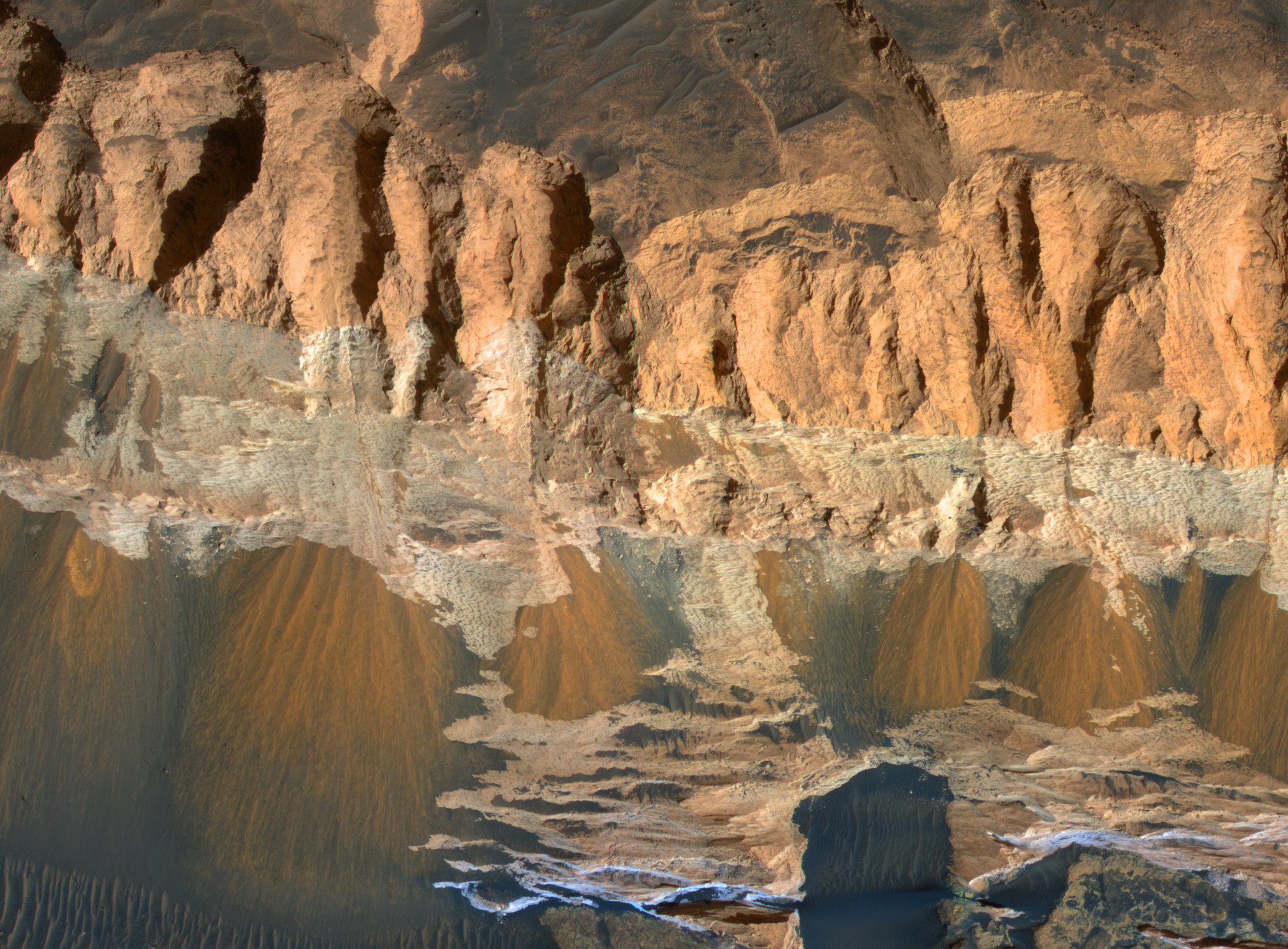
Badlands of Aram Chaos

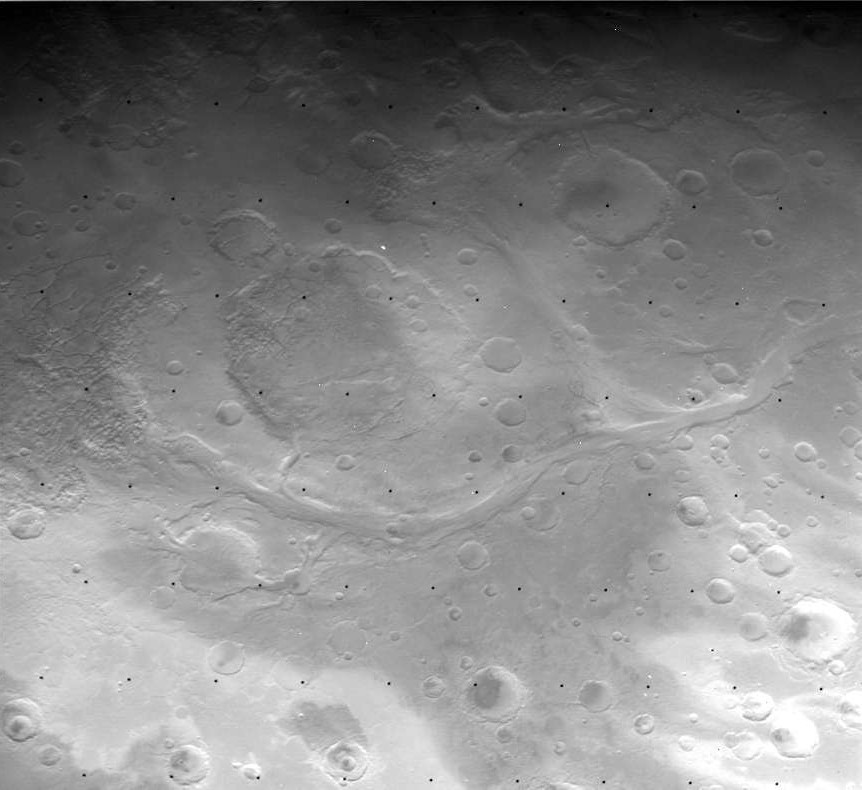
Viking 1 Orbiter image

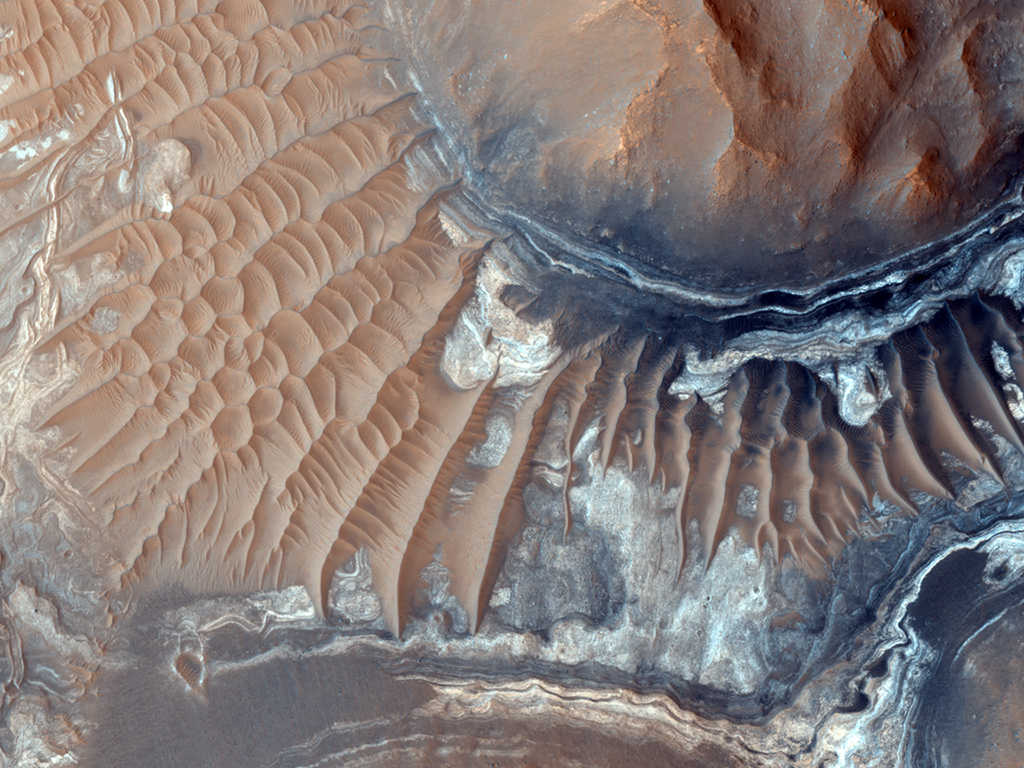
Eastern floor of Aram Chaos

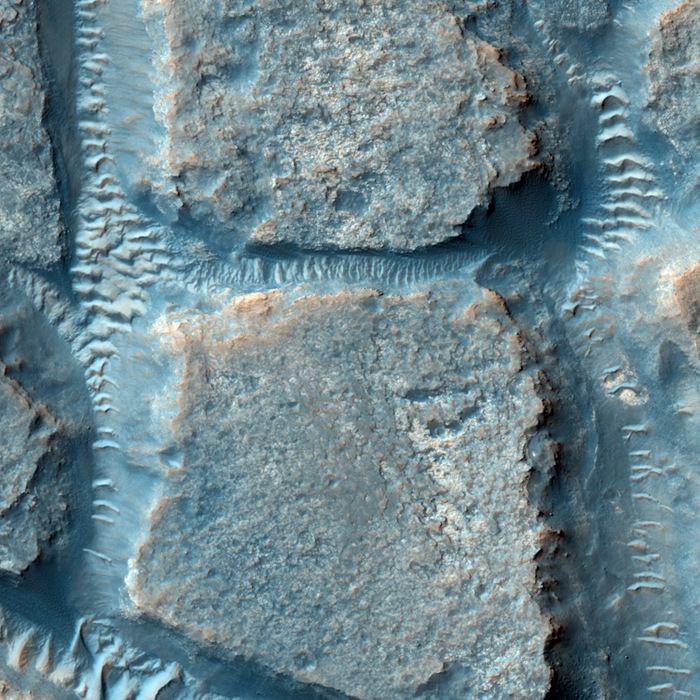
Minerals that form in water have been detected in the cliffs in the Aram Chaos region of Mars, as pictured.

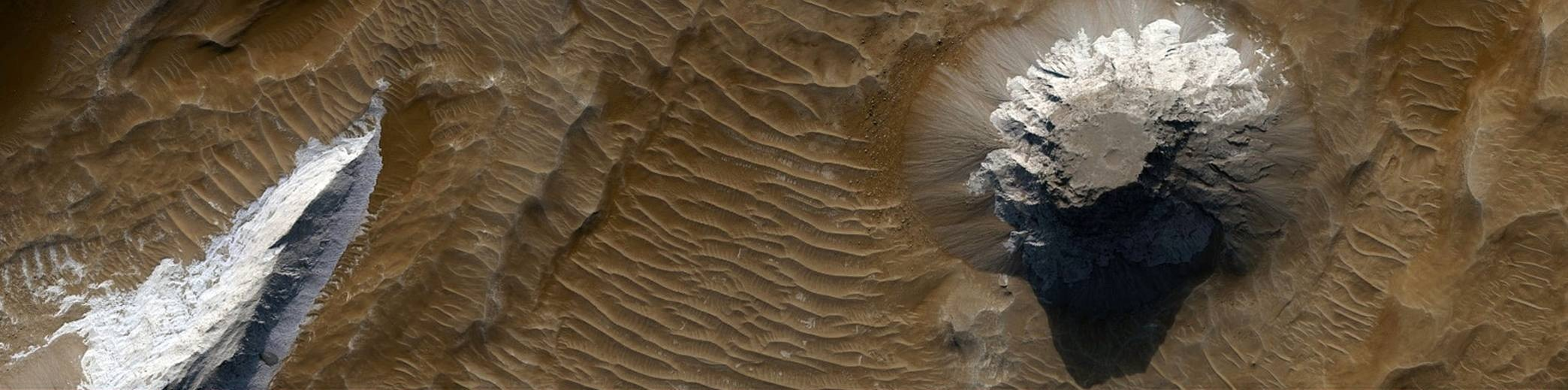
Sediments in Aram Chaos

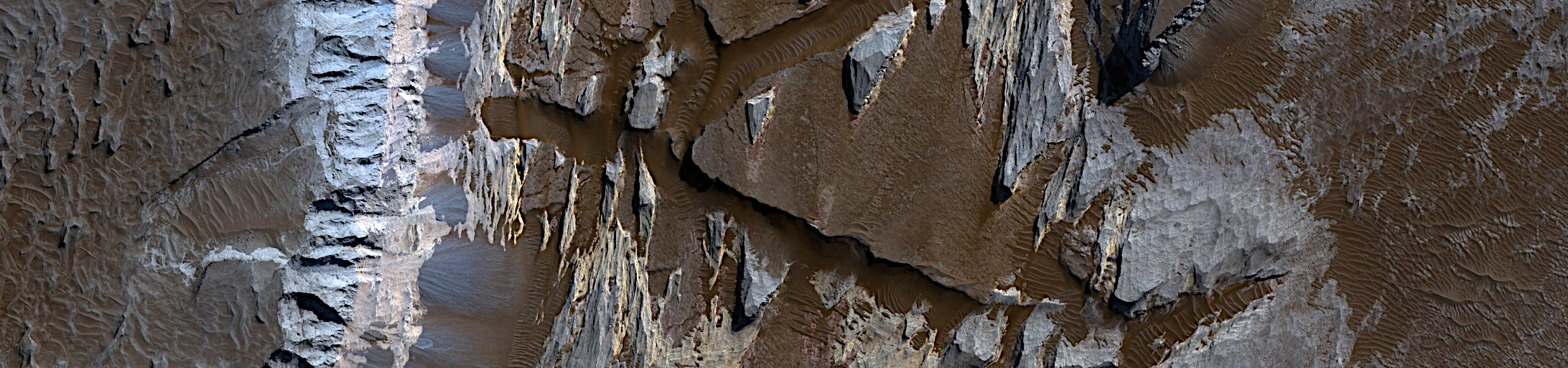
Gully landforms in Aram Choas

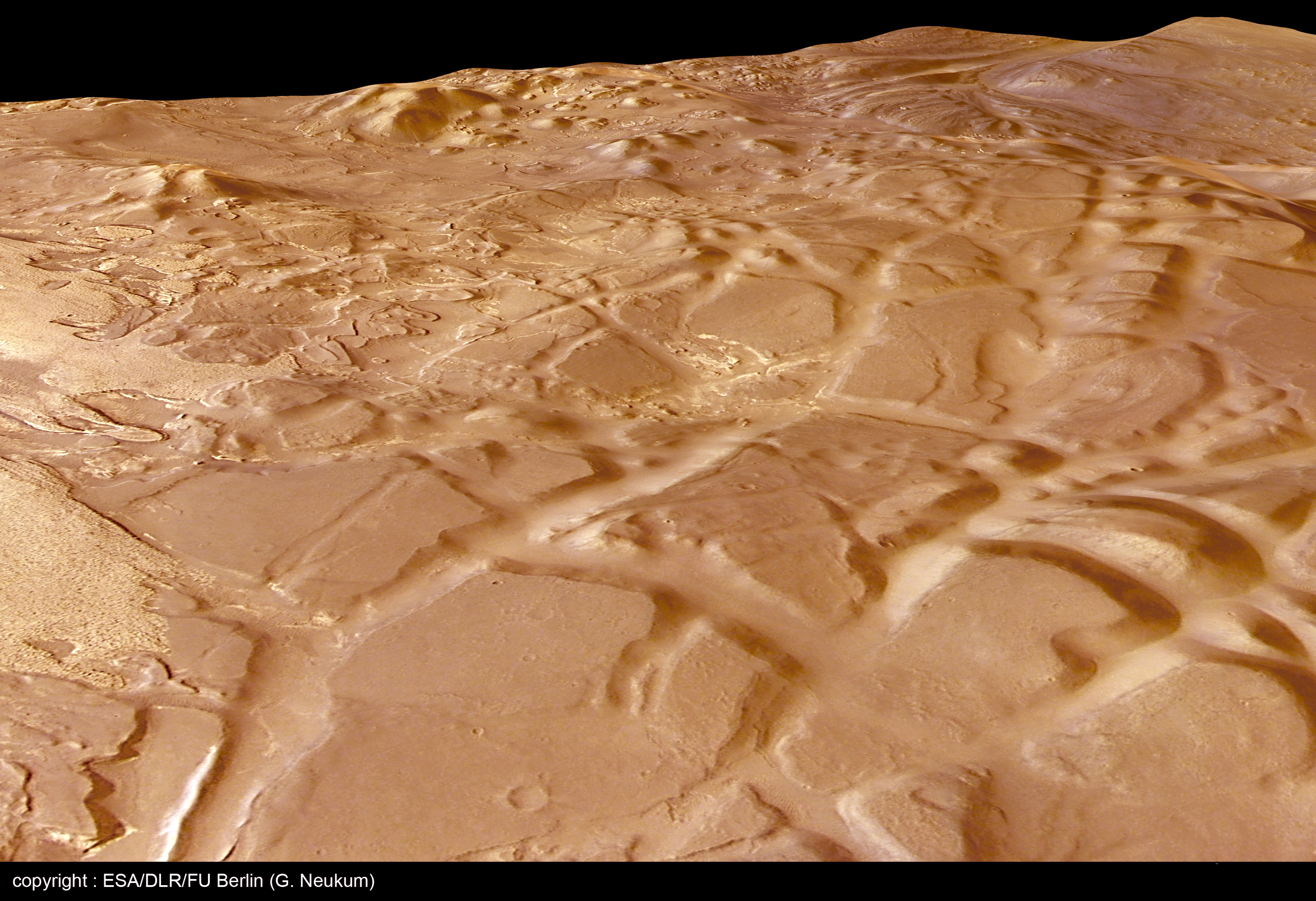
Aram Chaos in perspective view

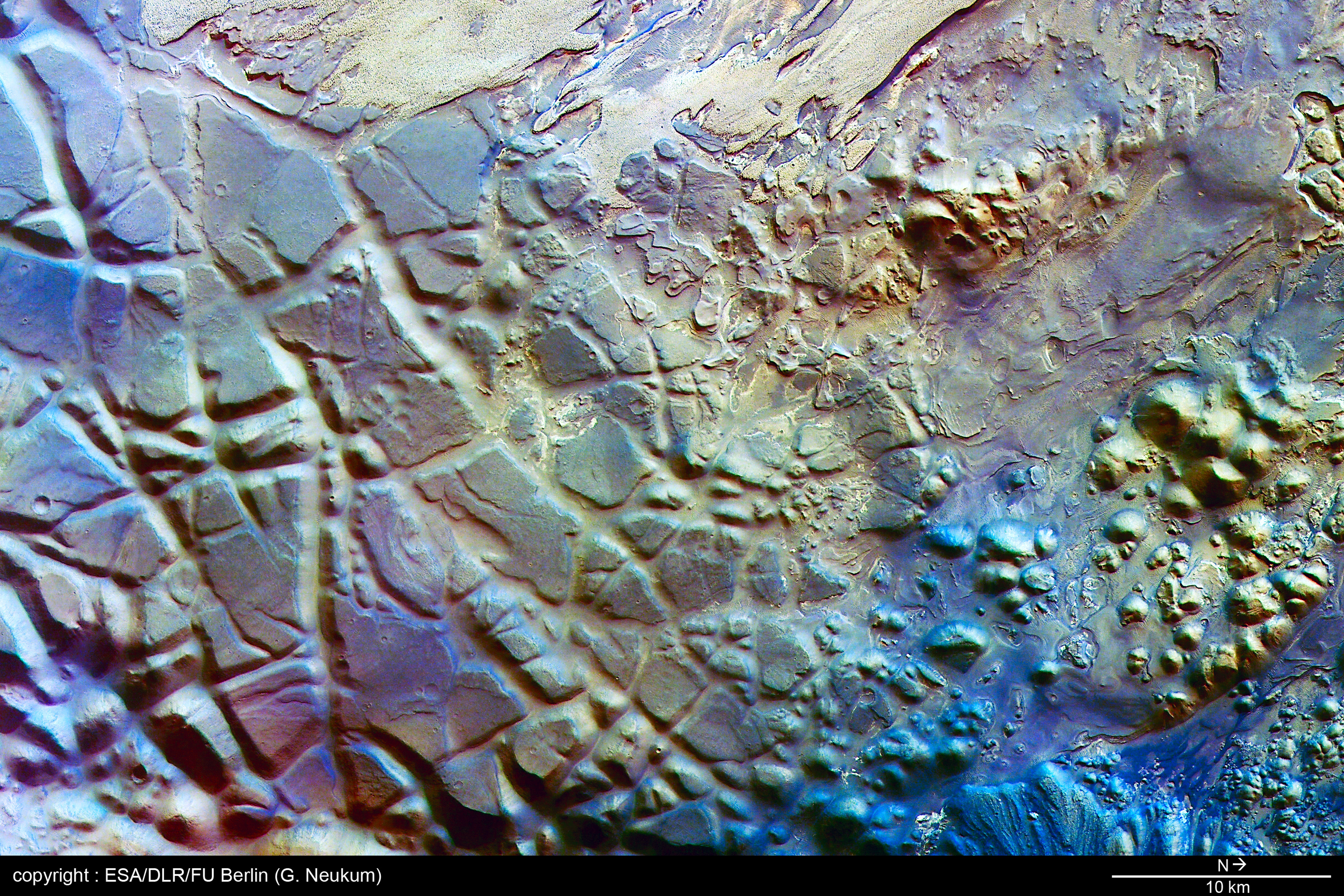
Aram Chaos in false color

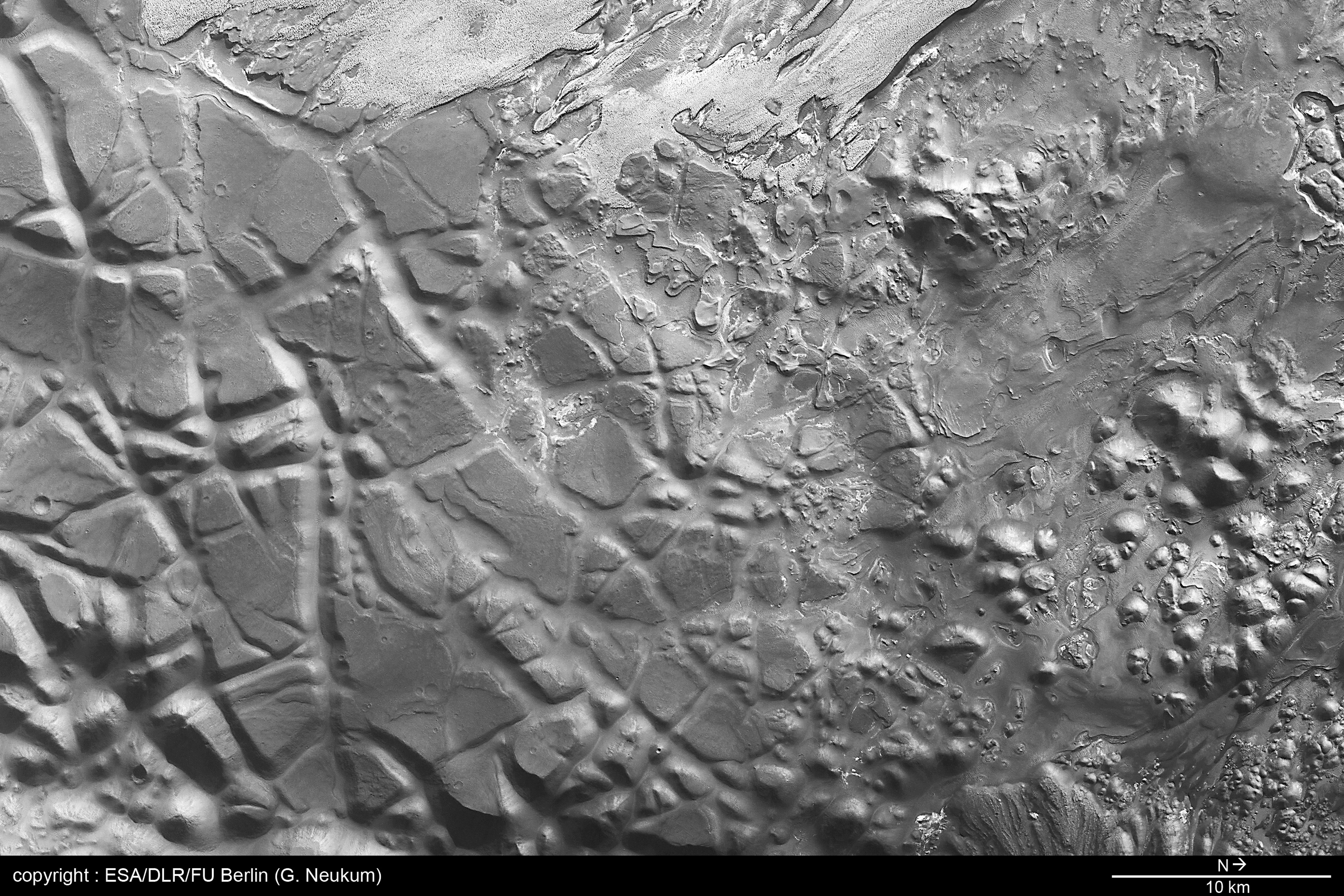
Aram Chaos in black and white

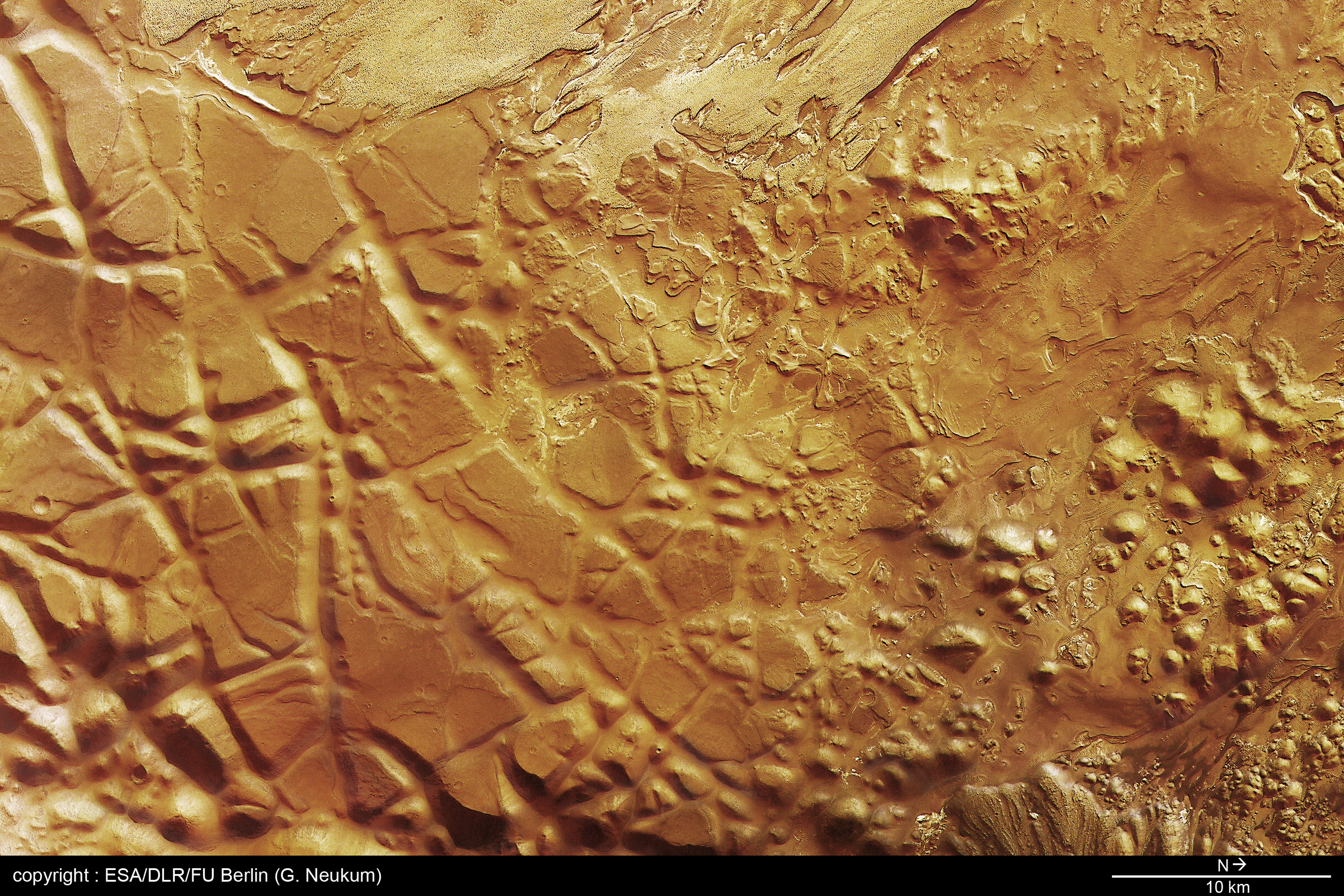
Aram Chaos in true color

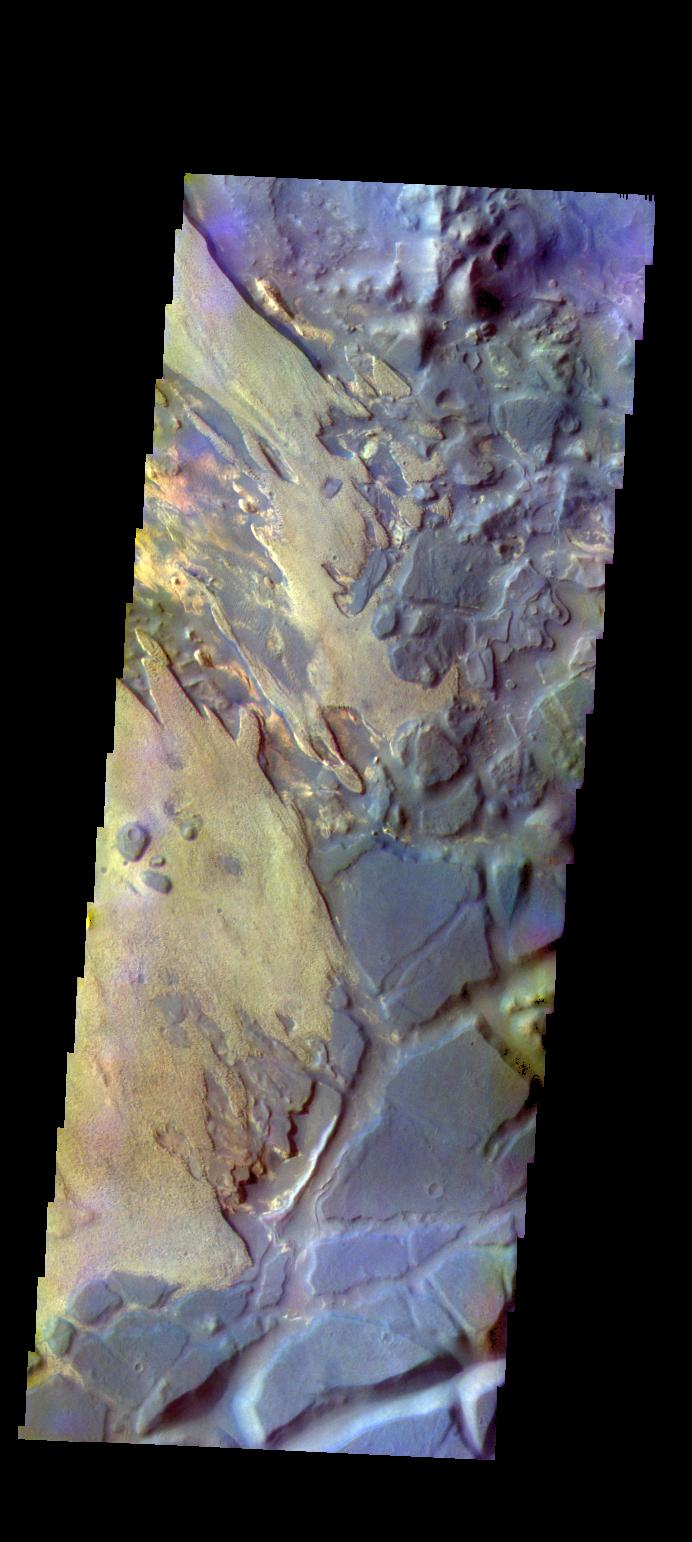
Aram Chaos as seen by HiRISE

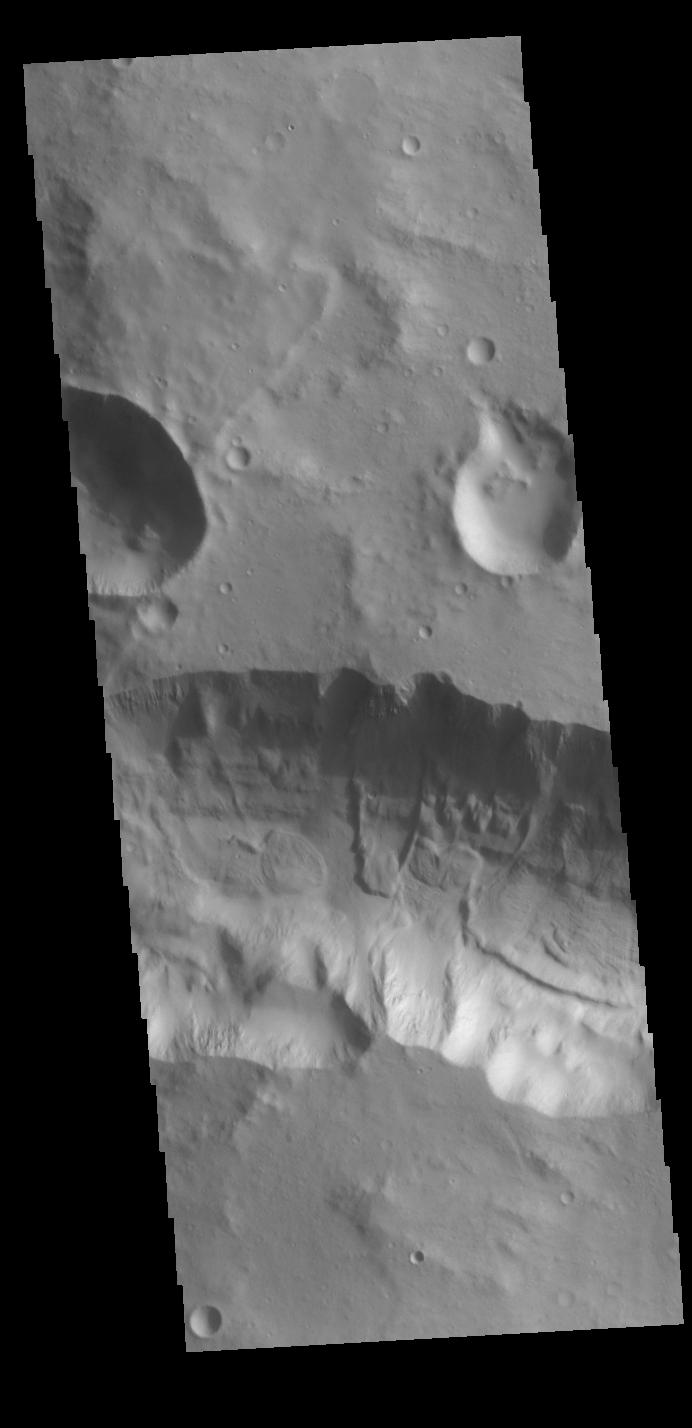
Hanging valleys in Aram Chaos, as seen by HiRISE under HiWish program

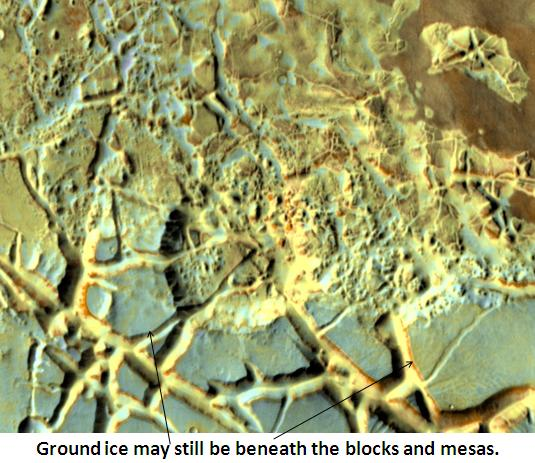
Blocks in Aram Chaos showing possible source of water, as seen by THEMIS

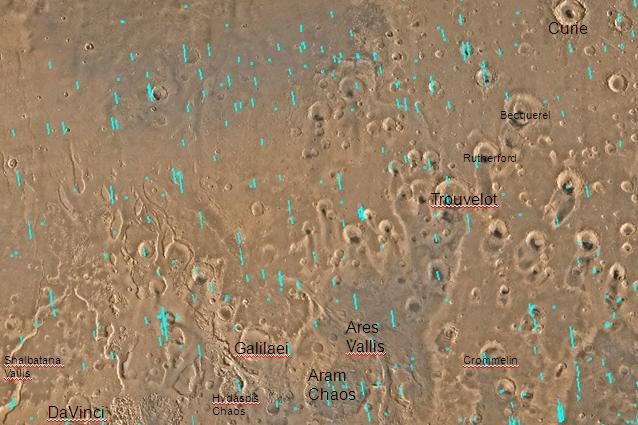
Quadrangle map of Oxia Palus labeled with major features. Aram Chaos is near the bottom of the image.

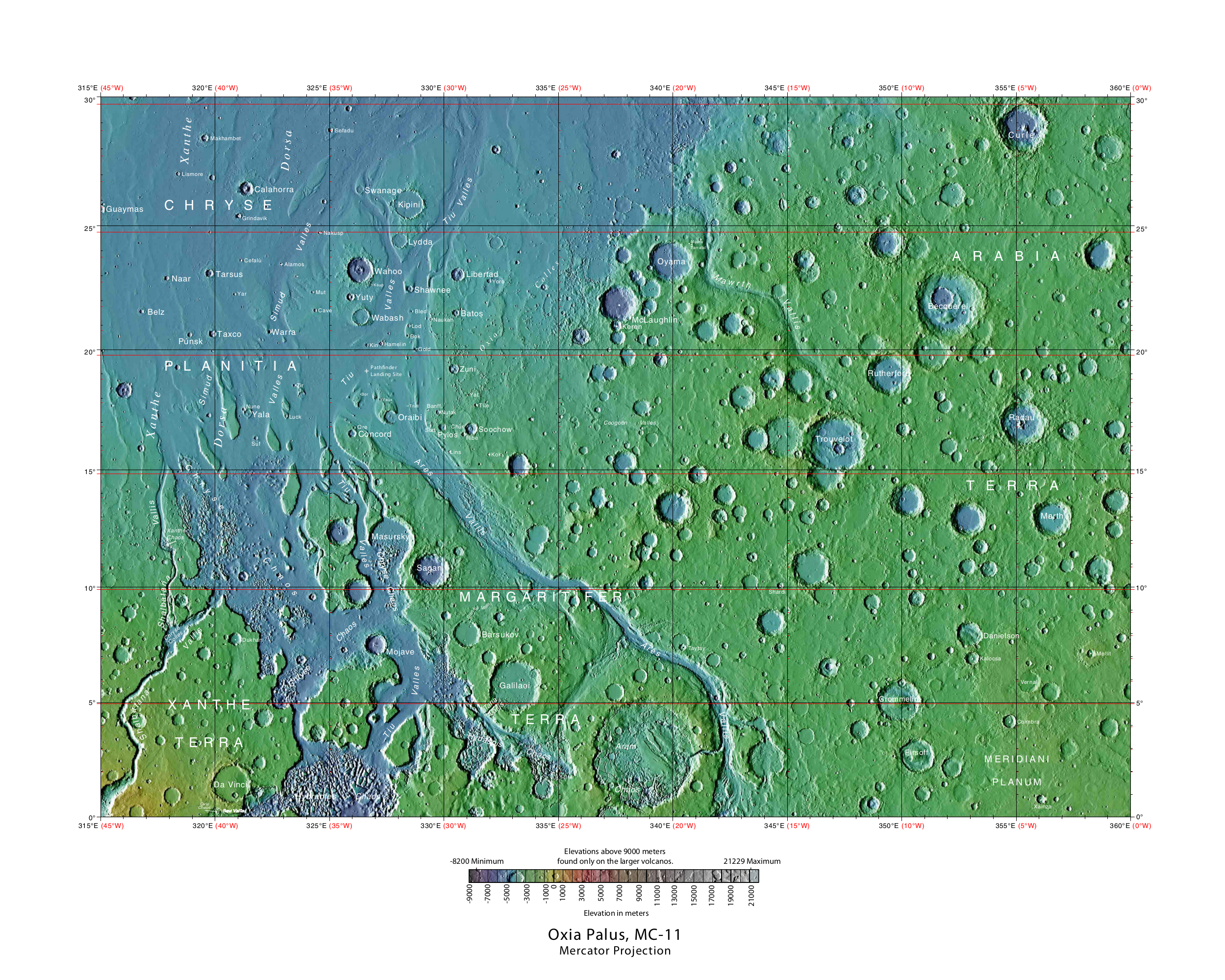
Topographic map of Oxia Palus region of Mars showing the location of a number of chaos regions, including Aram Chaos.

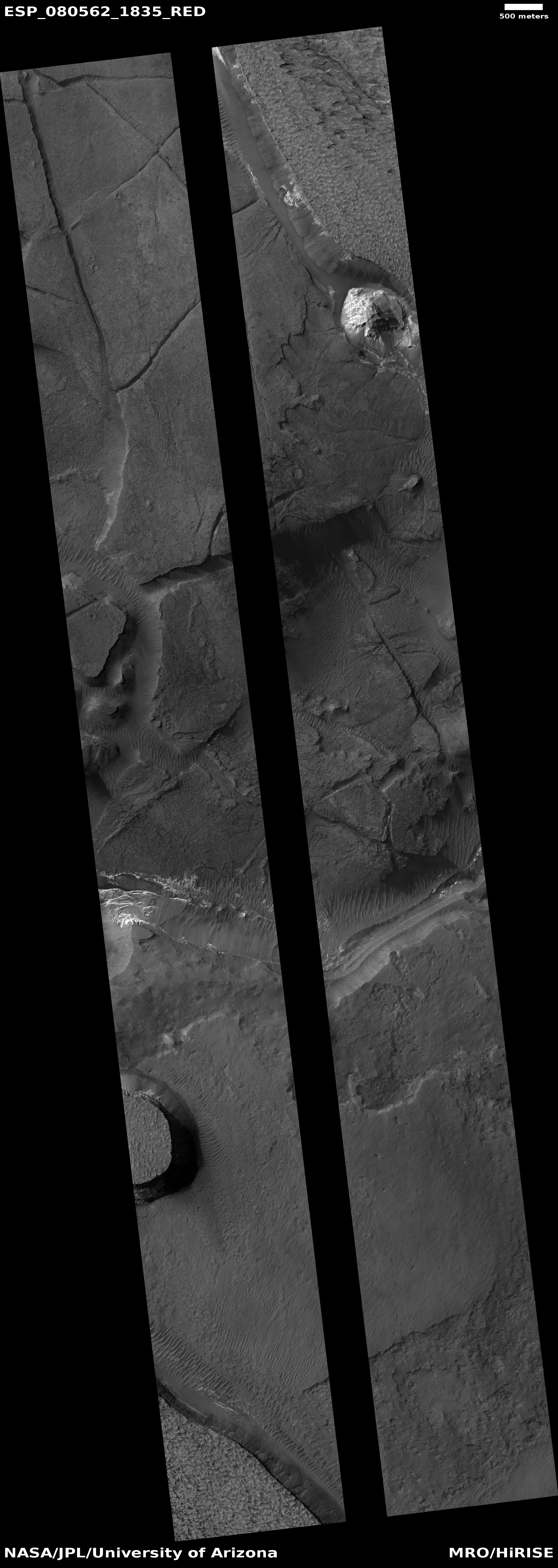
Wide view of Aram Chaos, as seen by HiRISE under the HiWish program. The black strip is where data was not gathered.

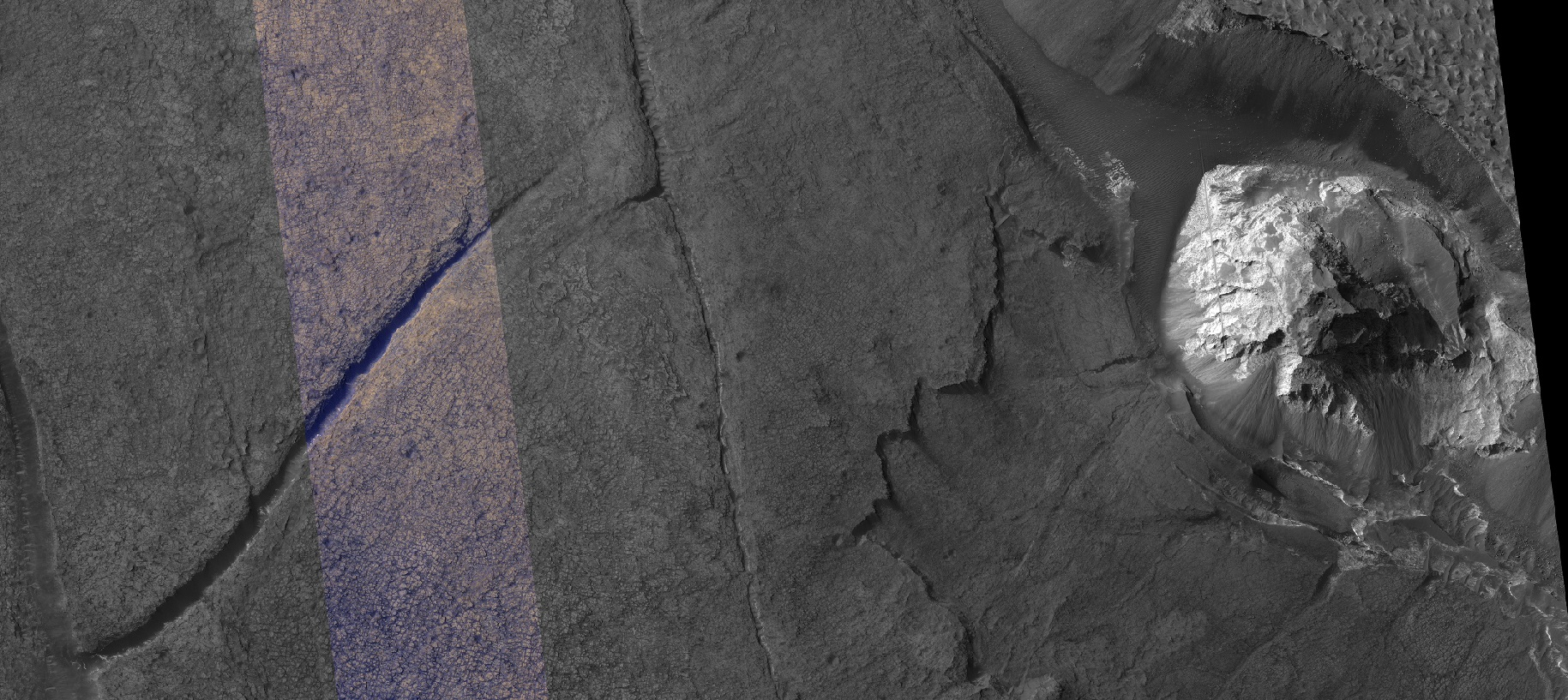
Aram Chaos with a light toned mound as seen by HiRISE under the HiWish program. The mound probably contains water bearing minerals.

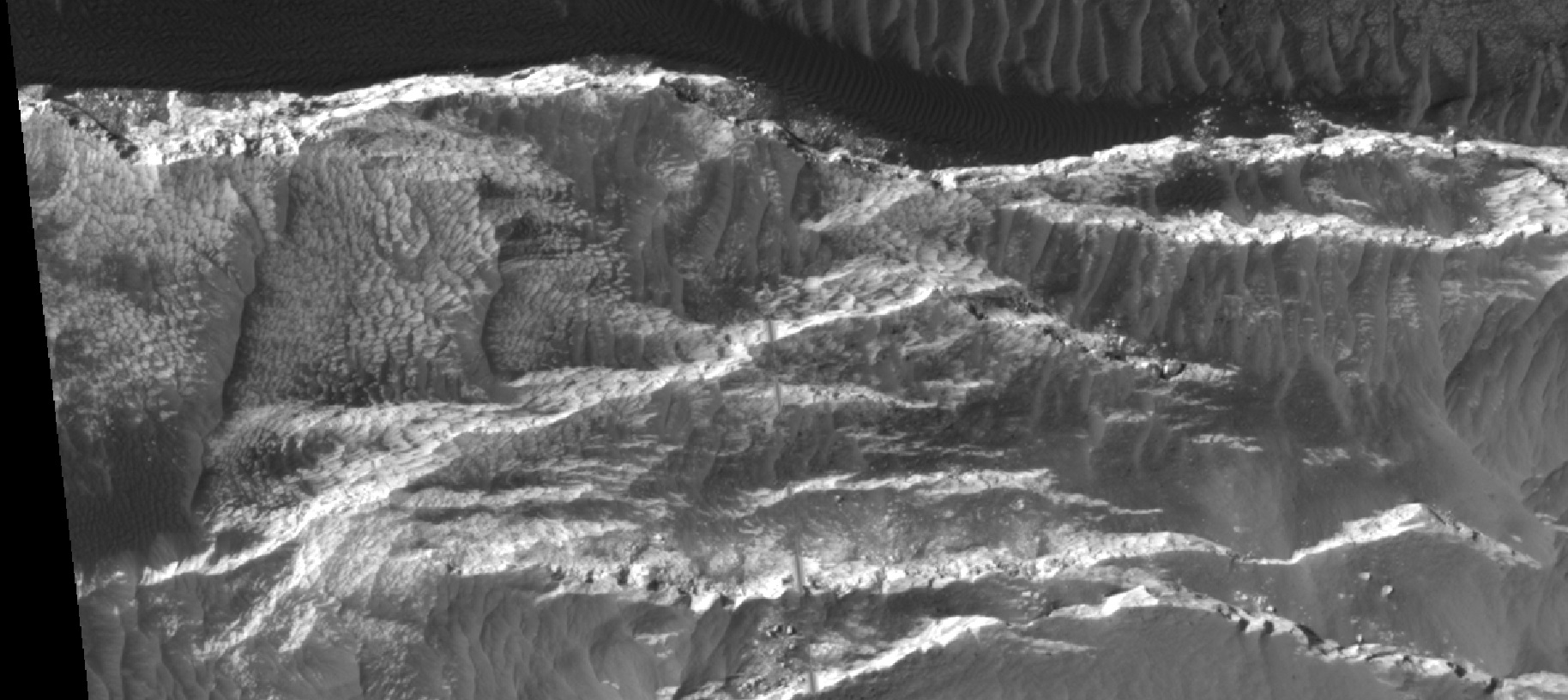
Light toned mound as seen by HiRISE under the HiWish program. The mound probably contains water bearing minerals.

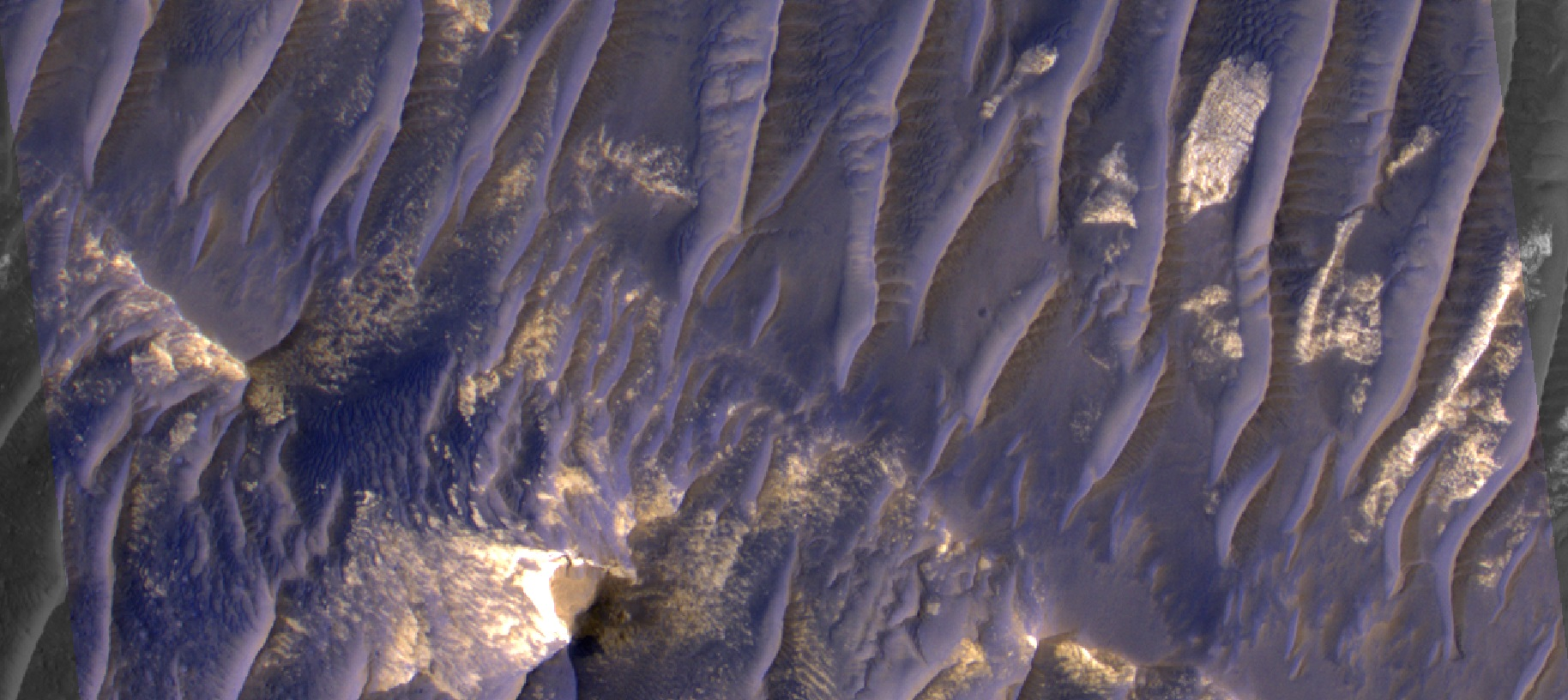
Dark sand on top of light toned material, as seen by HiRISE under the HiWish program.
