= Ferric hydroxysulfate =

Mineral

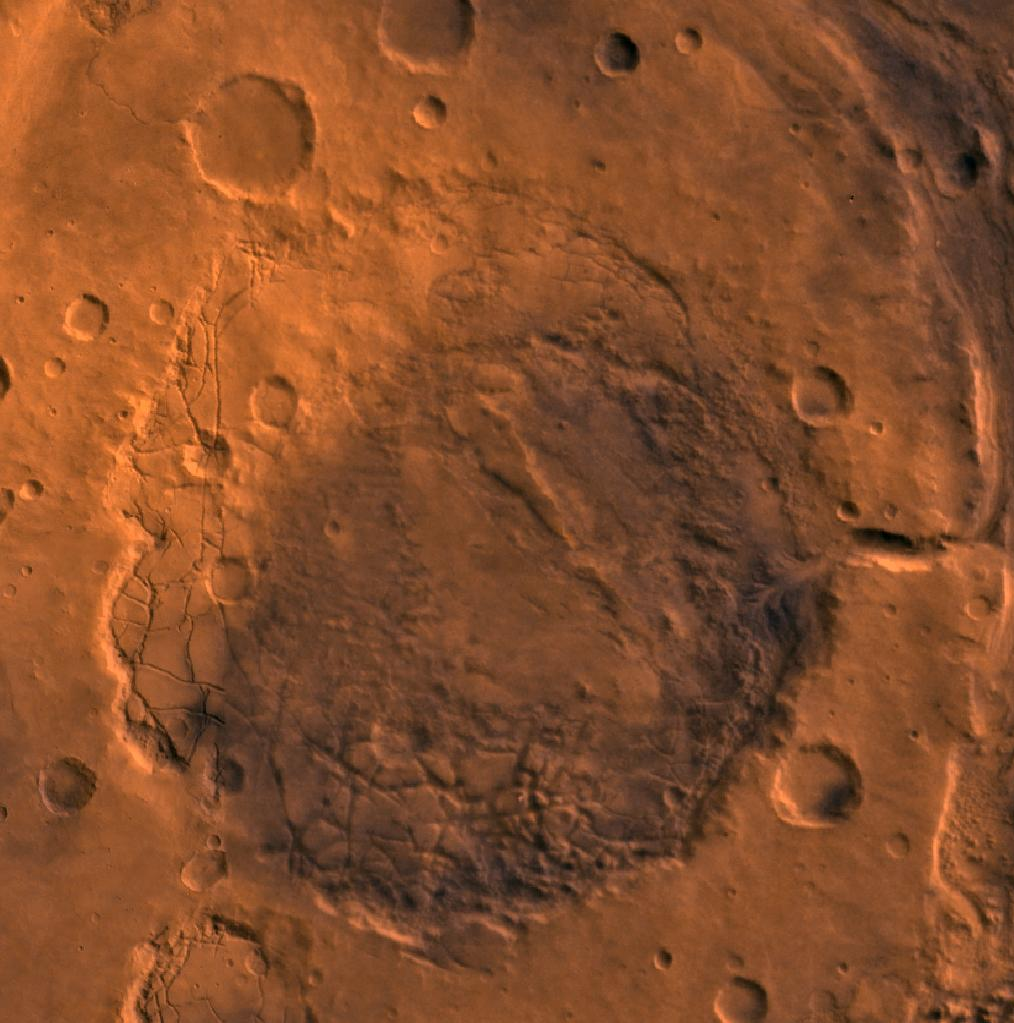
- Aram Chaos

General
- Category: Minerals
- Formula: Fe^{3+}SO_{4}OH

Ferric hydroxysulfate (Fe^{3+}SO_{4}OH) is a mineral located on Mars. It was discovered in the year 2025 by Bishop et al (2025) on Mars in the Aram Chaos crater and on the plateau above Juventae Chasma.

This mineral is formed by hydrous Fe^{2+} sulfates being heated to 100 °C or above which was provided from the deposition of ash and lava or by hydrothermal processes. Then hydrated ferrous sulfates are oxidated. The sulfates this mineral contains were likely left behind by sulfate-rich pools of water slowly drying up.
