= Arsinoes Chaos =

Chaos terrain on Mars

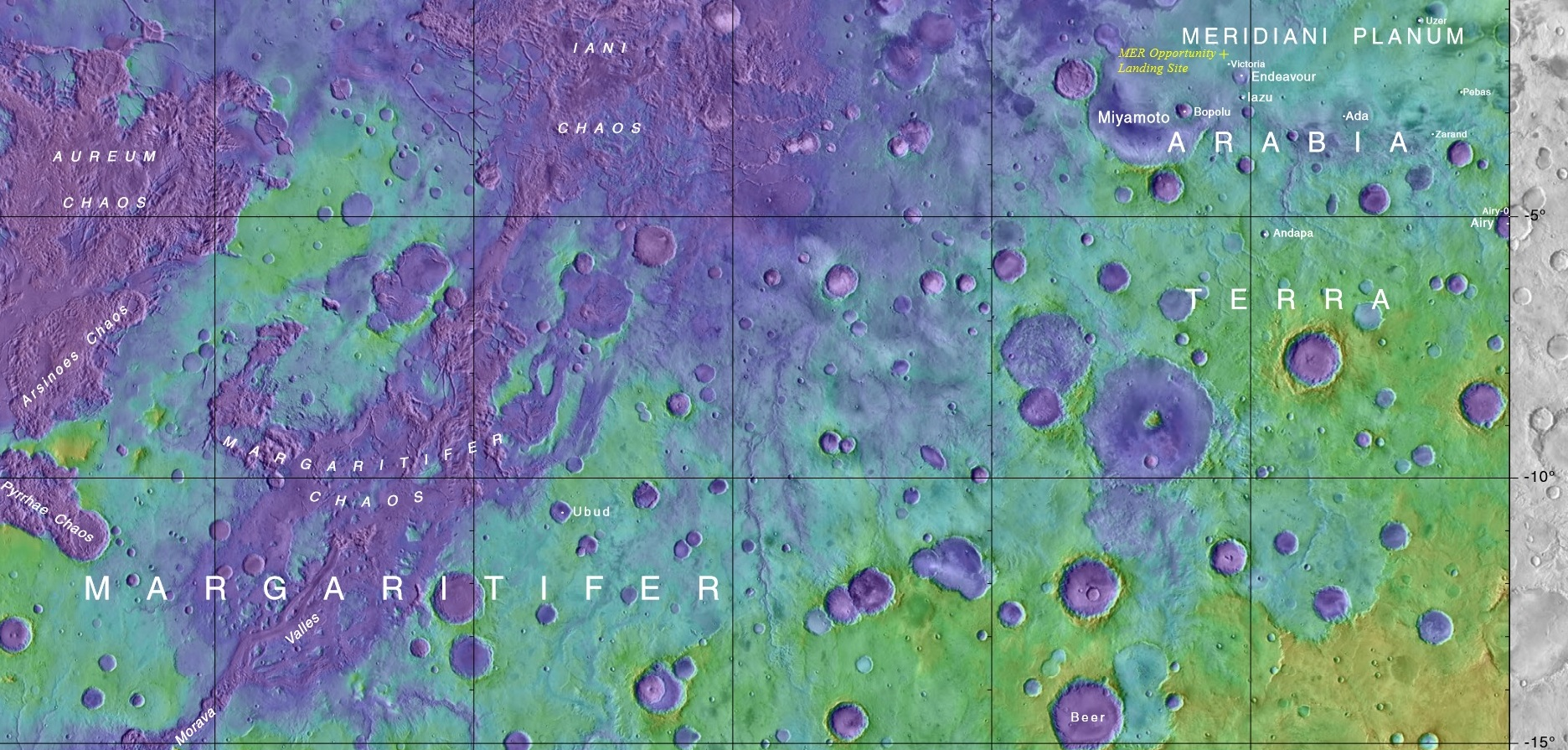
- Map showing location of Arsinoes Chaos (on the far left)
- Coordinates: 7.7°S 27.9°W
- Length: 200.1 km

Arsinoes Chaos is a chaos terrain in the Margaritifer Sinus quadrangle on Mars. It is 200 km in diameter. Its location is 7.66 °S and 27.9 °W. Arsinoes Chaos was named after Arsinoe, a queen of ancient Egypt, daughter of Ptolemy and Berenice.

Some buttes and mesas in Arsinoes display layering. Many places on Mars show rocks arranged in layers. Rock can form layers in a variety of ways. Volcanoes, wind, or water can produce layers. Layers can be hardened by the action of groundwater. Martian ground water probably moved hundreds of kilometers, and in the process it dissolved many minerals from the rock it passed through. When ground water surfaces in low areas containing sediments, water evaporates in the thin atmosphere and leaves behind minerals as deposits and/or cementing agents. Consequently, layers of dust could not later easily erode away since they were cemented together. On Earth, mineral-rich waters often evaporate forming large deposits of various types of salts and other minerals.

A detailed discussion of layering with many Martian examples can be found in Sedimentary Geology of Mars.

== See also ==
- List of areas of chaos terrain on Mars
