= Galilei =

Galilei is a surname, and may refer to:

- Vincenzo Galilei (1520–1591), composer, lutenist, and music theorist; father of Galileo
- Galileo Galilei (1564–1642), astronomer, philosopher, and physicist
- Michelagnolo Galilei (1575–1631), Baroque lutenist and composer, brother of Galileo
- Alessandro Galilei (1691–1736), Florentine mathematician and architect, distant relative of Galileo

Two craters have been named for Galileo Galilei, with a different spelling:

- Galilaei (lunar crater), on the Moon
- Galilaei (Martian crater), on Mars

== See also ==
- Galilei number
- Galilei Donna
- Galilei ja kadonneet lelut
- Galilean § Other meanings
