= Hydraotes Chaos =

Region in Mars

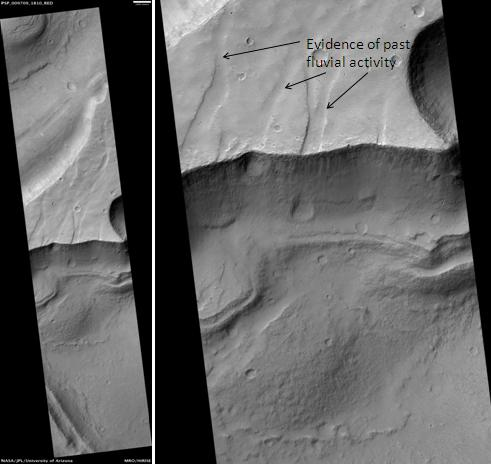
- Hydraotes Chaos, as seen by HiRISE. Click on image to see channels and layers. The scale bar is 1000 meters long.
- Coordinates: 0.8°N 35.4°W

Hydraotes Chaos is a broken-up region in the Oxia Palus quadrangle of Mars, located at 0.8° North and 35.4° West. It is 417.5 km across and was named after a classical albedo feature name. More information and more examples of chaos regions can be found at Martian chaos terrain. The area contains small conical edifices, called Hydraotes Colles, which were interpreted as the Martian equivalent of terrestrial cinder cones formed by volcanic activity.

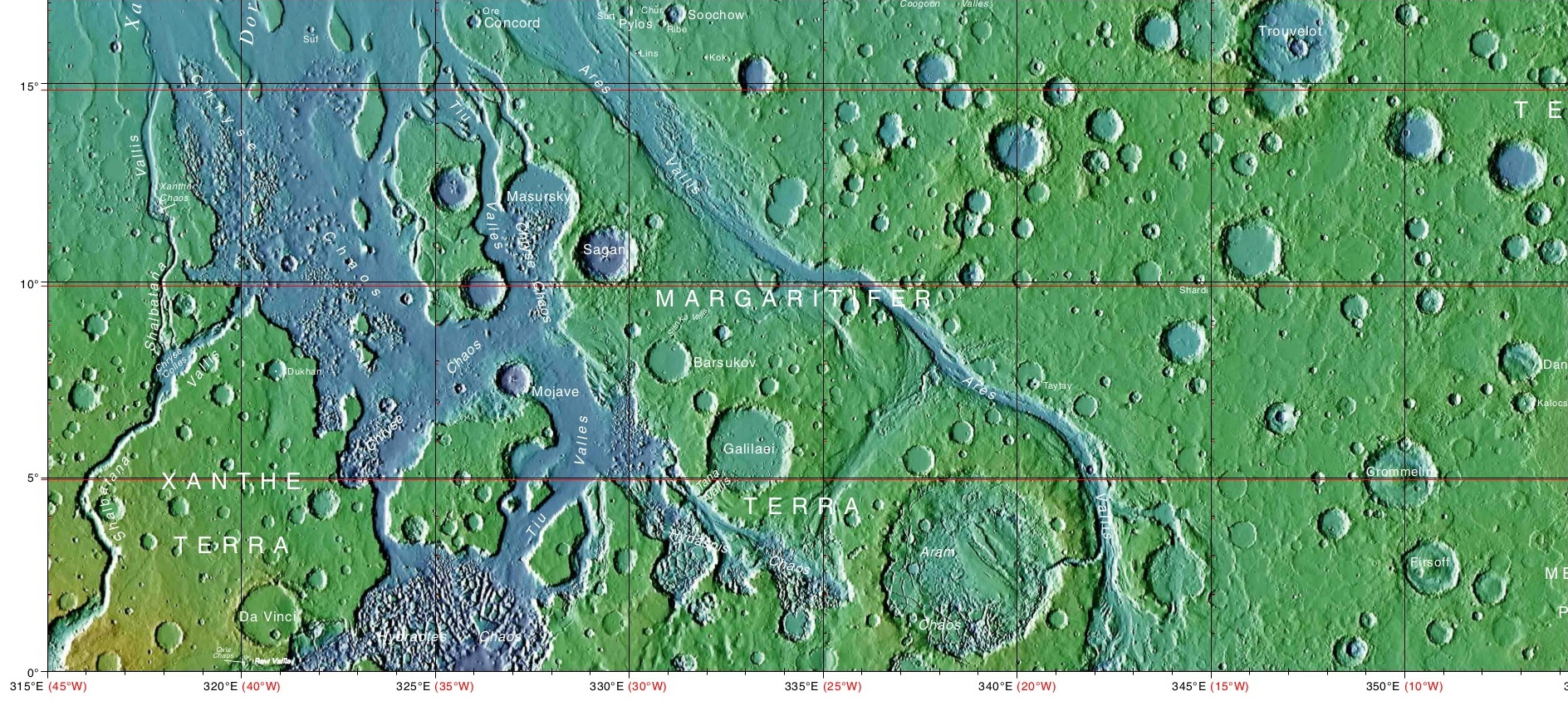
Topographic map of Oxia Palus region of Mars showing the location of a number of chaos regions, including Hydrates Chaos

== See also ==
- Chaos terrain
- Geology of Mars
- HiRISE
- List of areas of chaos terrain on Mars
- Martian chaos terrain
