= Aurorae Chaos =

Region of chaos terrain on Mars

Aurorae Chaos is a region of chaos terrain on Mars at the eastern end of the outflow channels from Valles Marineris into Chryse Planitia, centered at approximately ~324°E, 9°S. It is in the Margaritifer Sinus quadrangle.

Many layers are visible in the walls of Aurorae Chaos. Rock can form layers in a variety of ways. Volcanoes, wind, or water can produce layers. A detailed discussion of layering with many Martian examples can be found in Sedimentary Geology of Mars.

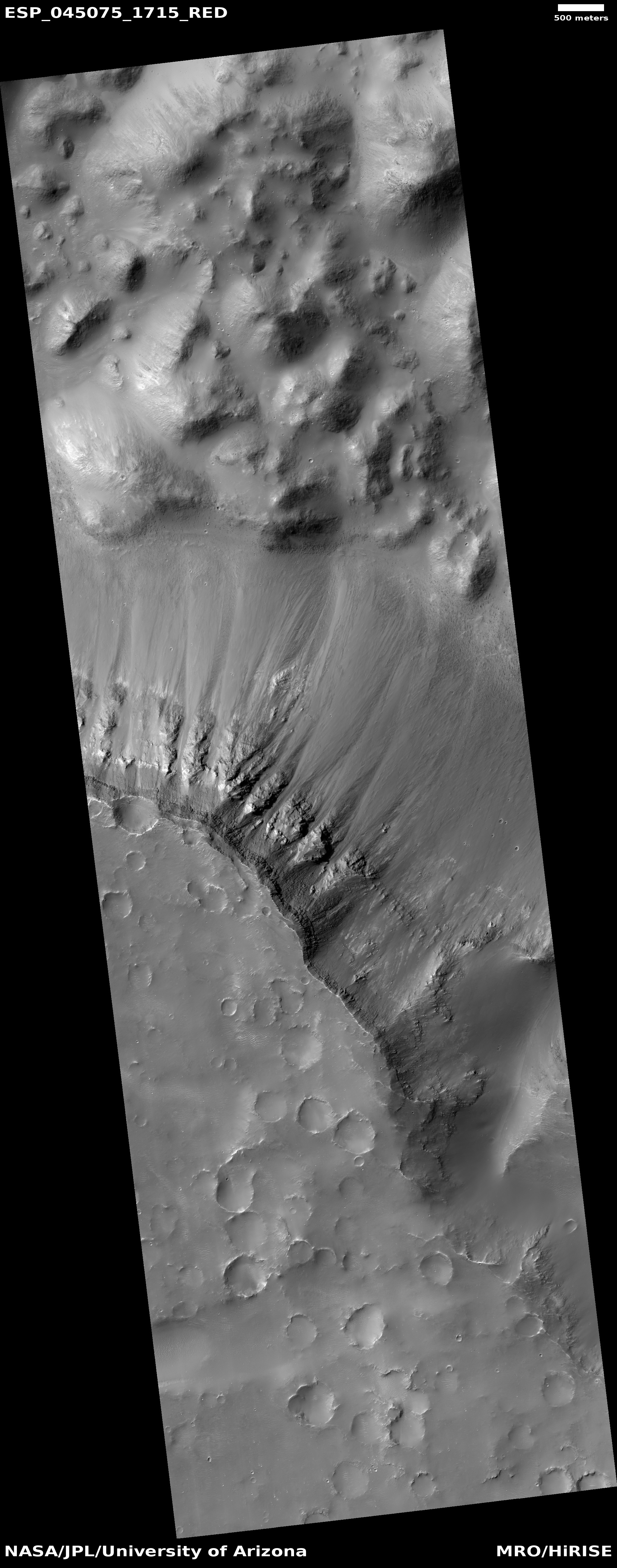
Wide view of layers in wall of Aurorae Chaos, as seen by HiRISE under HiWish program

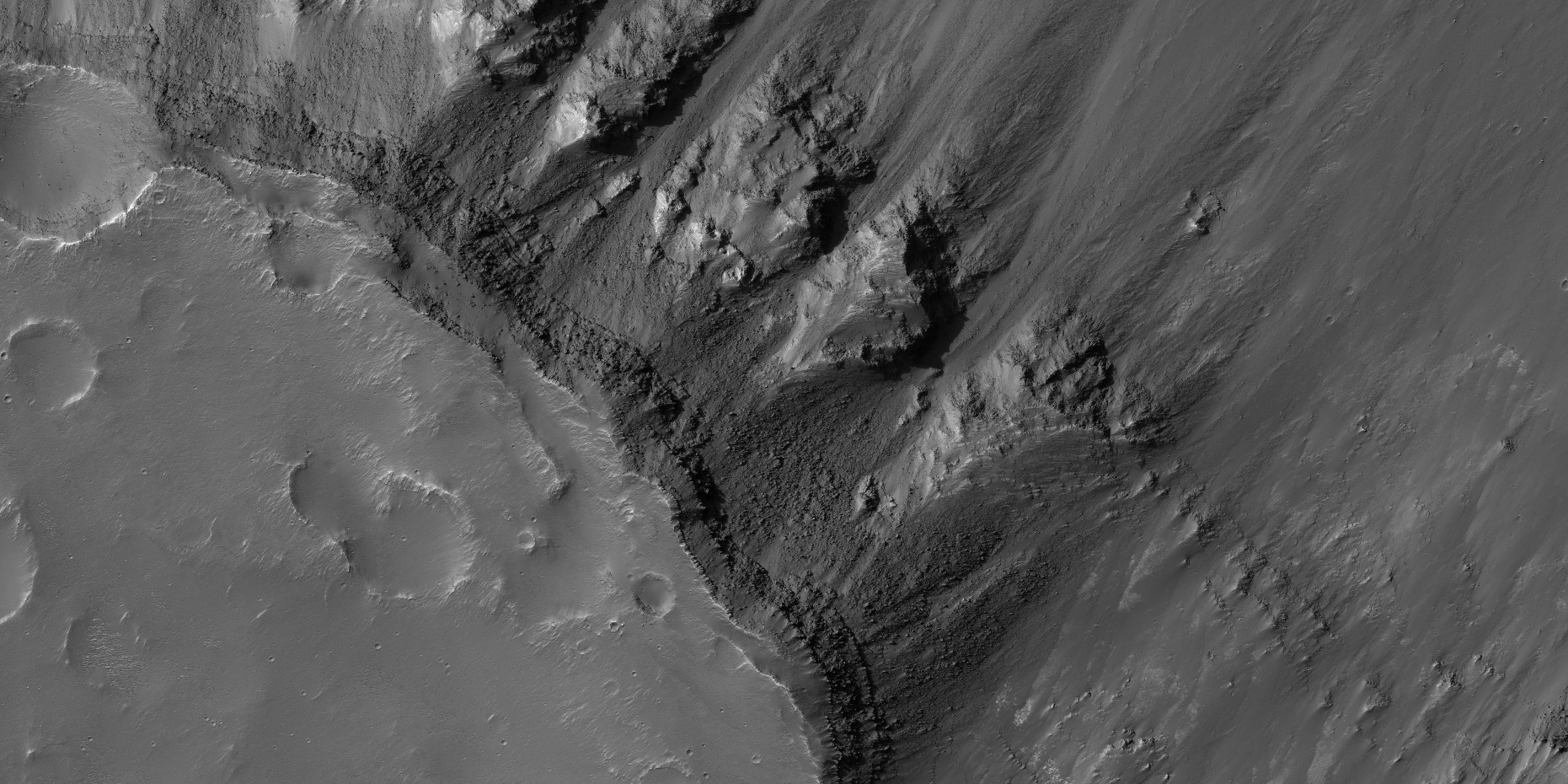
Close view of layers from previous image, as seen by HiRISE under HiWish program

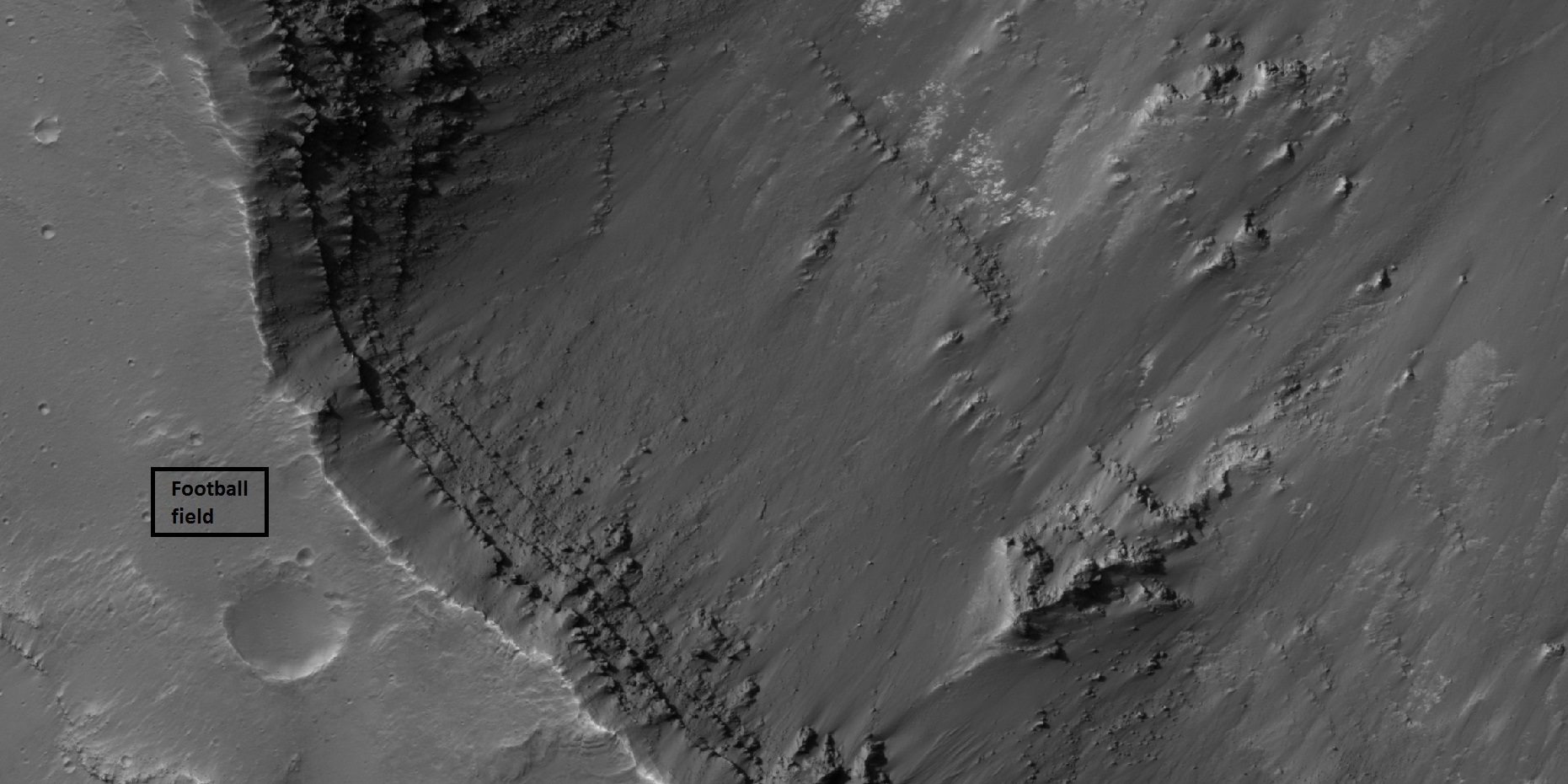
Close view of layers from a previous image, as seen by HiRISE under HiWish program Box shows the size of football field.

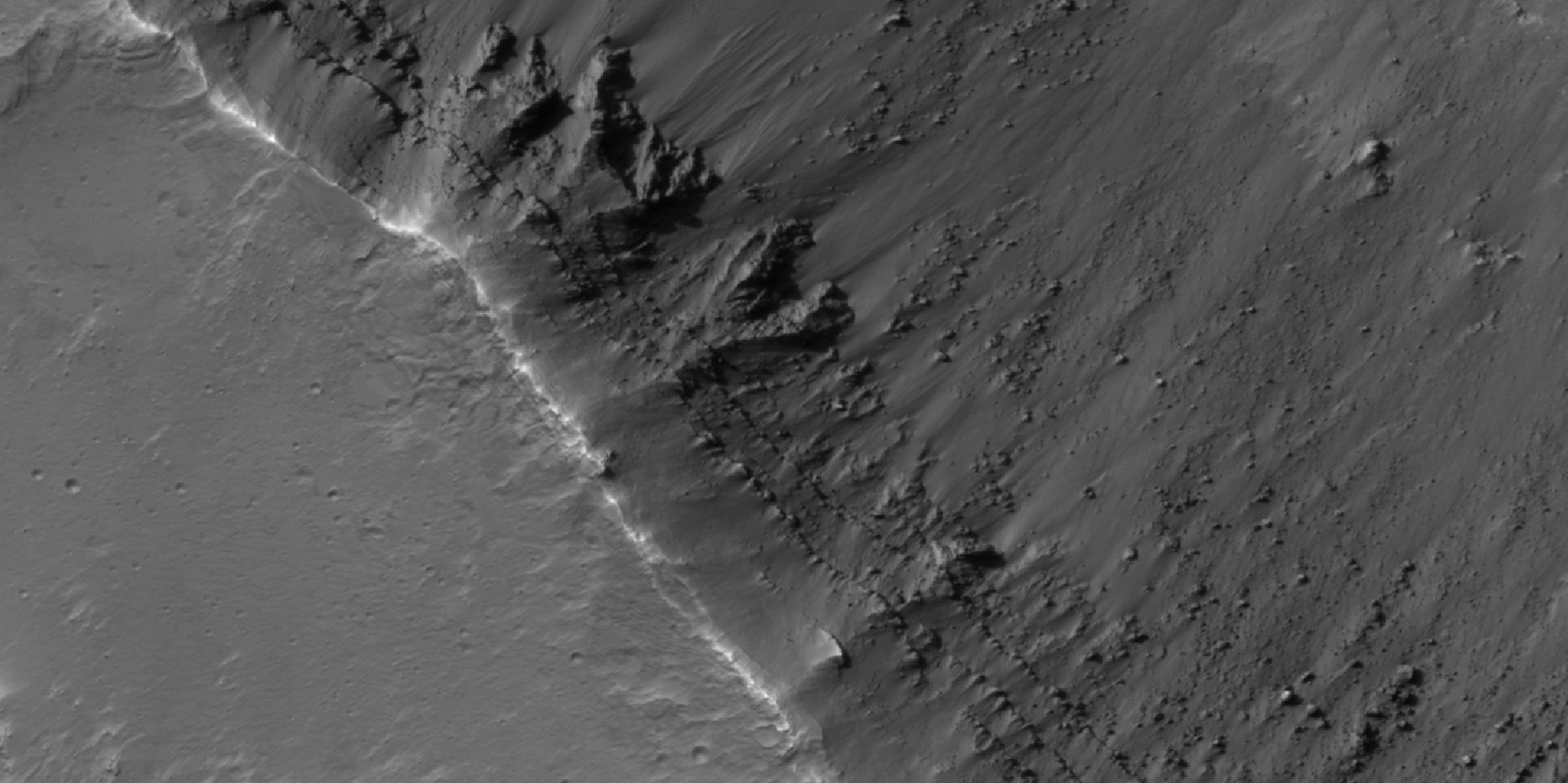
Close view of layers from a previous image, as seen by HiRISE under HiWish program

== See also ==
- Areas of chaos terrain on Mars
- Chaos terrain
- HiRISE
- HiWish program
- Mars
- Geology of Mars
- Martian chaos terrain
- Outflow channels

== Recommended reading ==
- Grotzinger, J. and R. Milliken (eds.). 2012. Sedimentary Geology of Mars. SEPM.
