= Ister Chaos =

Chaos terrain on Mars

- Ister Chaos based on THEMIS day-time image.
- Coordinates: 13.0°N 56.4°W
- Naming: a classical albedo feature at 10N, 56W

Ister Chaos is a broken up area in the Lunae Palus quadrangle of Mars. It is located at 13.0° N and 56.4° W. It is 103.4 km across and was named after a classical albedo feature at 10N, 56W.

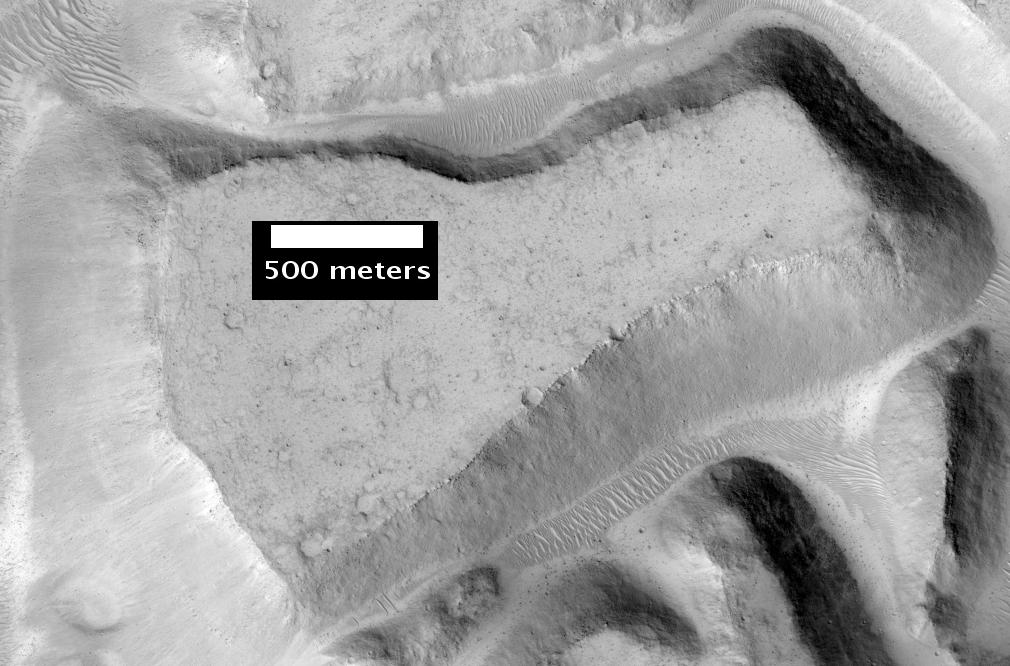
Close-up of Ister Chaos, as seen by HiRISE.

== See also ==
- Chaos terrain
- Geology of Mars
- HiRISE
- List of areas of chaos terrain on Mars
- Martian chaos terrain
