= Hydaspis Chaos =

Chaos on Mars

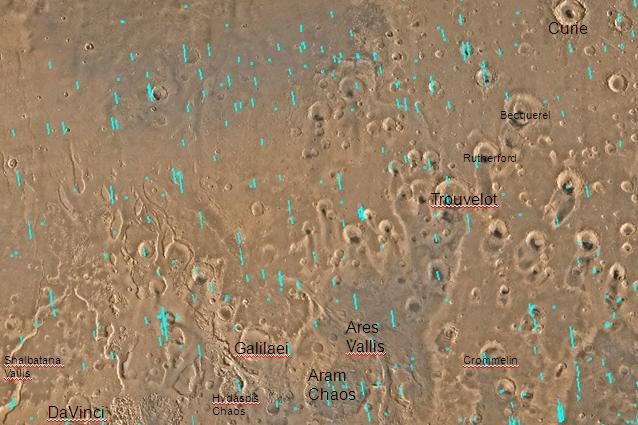
- Quadrangle map of Oxia Palus labeled with major features. This quadrangle contains many collapsed areas of Chaos and many outflow channels (old river valleys).
- Coordinates: 3.2°N 27.1°W

Hydaspis Chaos is a region in the Oxia Palus quadrangle of Mars, located at 3.2° north latitude and 27.1° west longitude. The region is about 355 km across. It was named after a classical albedo feature.

== River Valleys and Chaos ==
Many large, ancient river valleys are found in this area; along with collapsed features, called Chaos. The Chaotic features may have collapsed when water came out of the surface. Some of the rivers begin with a Chaos region. A chaotic region can be recognized by a rat's nest of mesas, buttes, and hills, chopped through with valleys which in places look almost patterned. Some parts of this chaotic area have not collapsed completely—they are still formed into large mesas, so they may still contain water ice. Chaotic terrain occurs in numerous locations on Mars, and always gives the strong impression that something abruptly disturbed the ground. The chaos regions formed long ago. By counting craters (more craters in any given area means an older surface) and by studying the valleys' relations with other geological features, scientists conclude the channels formed 2.0 to 3.8 billion years ago.

One generally accepted view for the formation of large outflow channels is that they were formed by catastrophic floods of water released from giant groundwater reservoirs. Perhaps, the water started to come out of the ground due to faulting or volcanic activity. Sometimes hot magma just travels under the surface. If that is the case, the ground will be heated, but there may be no evidence of lava at the surface. After the water escaped, the surface would collapse. Moving across the surface, the water would have simultaneously froze and evaporated. Chunks of ice that would have rapidly formed may have enhanced the erosive power of the flood. Furthermore, the water may have frozen over at the surface, but continuing to flow underneath. Rivers in cold climates on the Earth often become ice-covered, yet continue to flow.

Such catastrophic floods have occurred on Earth. One commonly cited example is the Channeled Scabland of Washington State; it was formed by the breakout of water from the Pleistocene Lake Missoula. This region resembles the martian outflow channels.

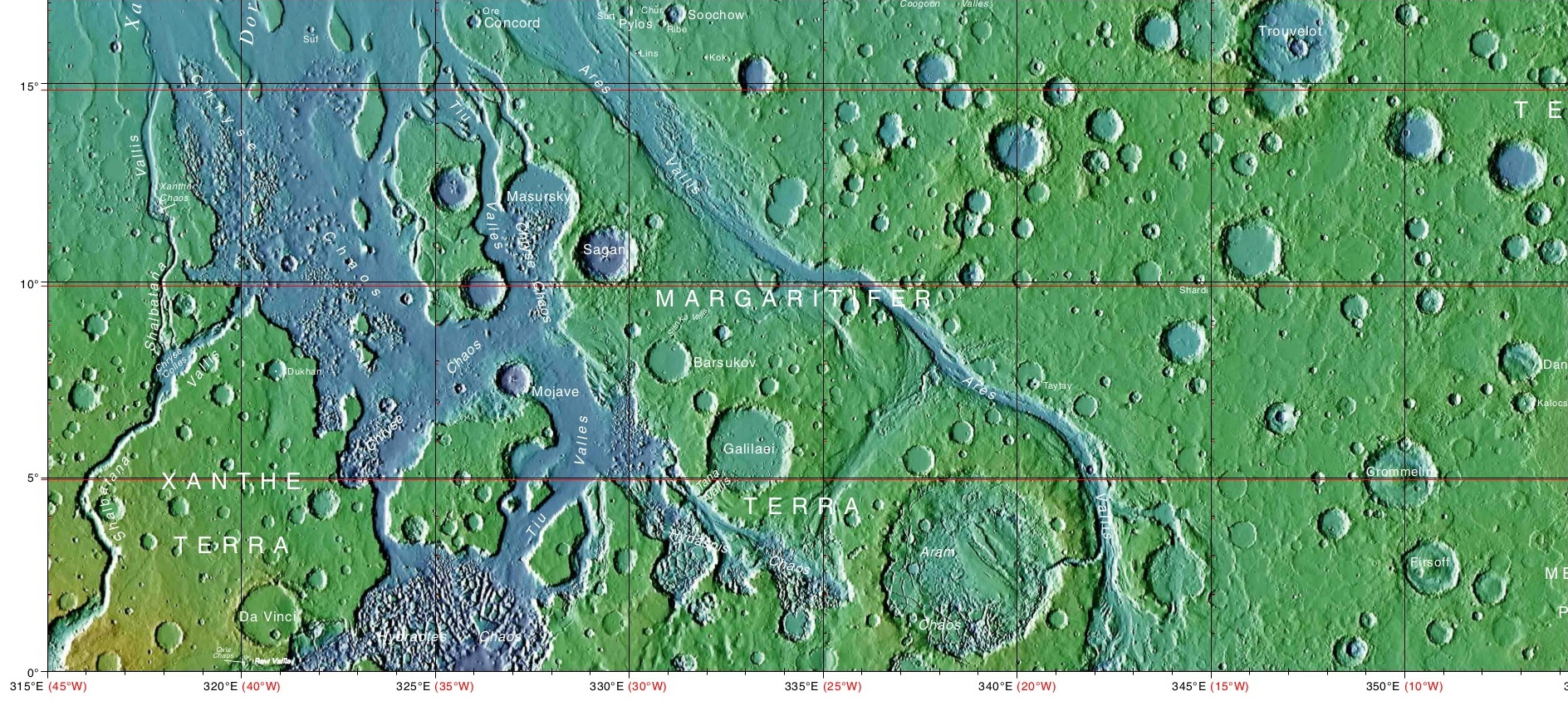
Topographic map of Oxia Palus region of Mars showing the location of a number of chaos regions, including Hydaspis Chaos

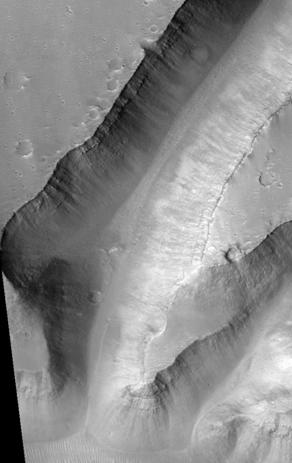
Hydaspis Chaos, as seen by HiRISE.

== See also ==
- Chaos terrain
- HiRISE
- List of areas of chaos terrain on Mars
- Martian chaos terrain
- Outflow channels
