= Galilaei =

Galilaei is the name of two craters named after the astronomer Galileo Galilei:

- Galilaei (lunar crater), crater on the Moon
- Galilaei (Martian crater), crater on Mars
