= Galilaei (Martian crater) =

Crater on Mars

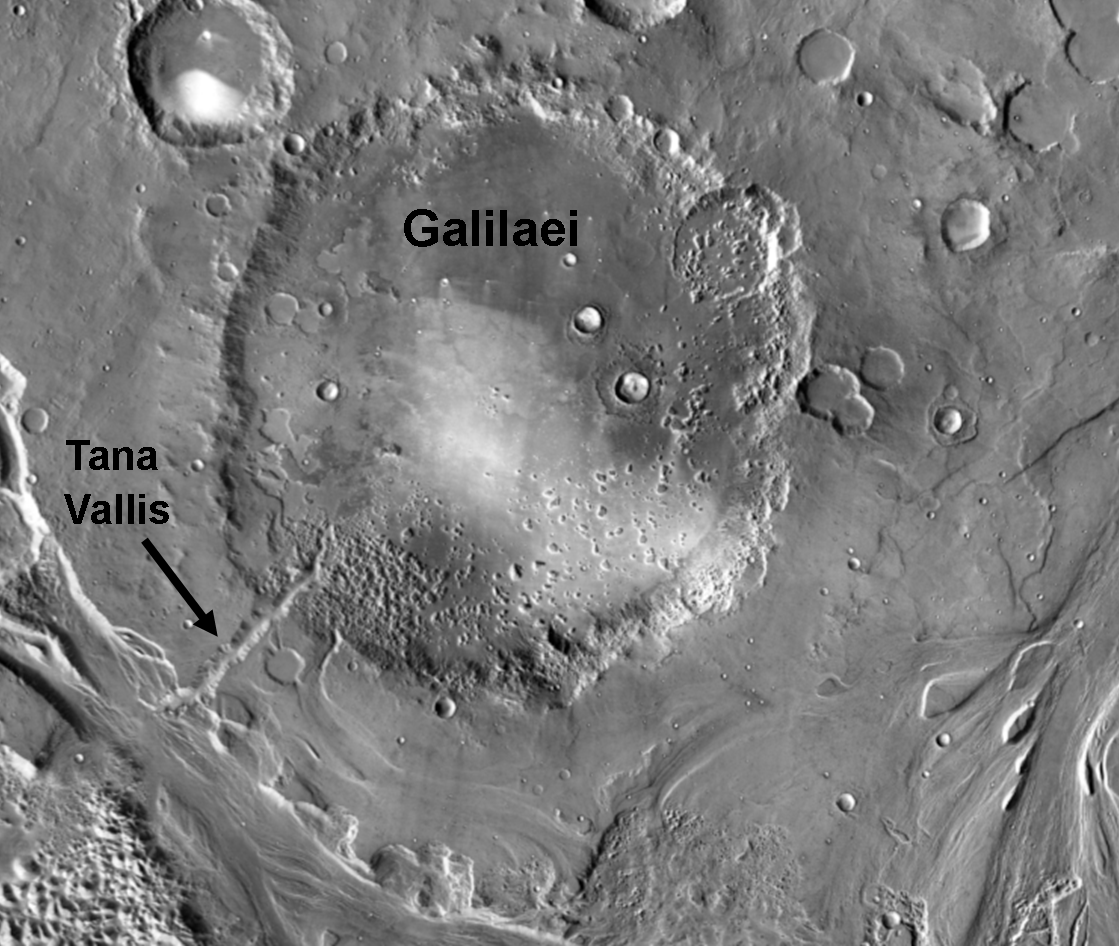
Daytime infrared image mosaic of Oxia Palus generated using Thermal Emission Imaging System (THEMIS) images from the 2001 Mars Odyssey orbiter mission. Mosaic generated at 100 meters/pixel resolution.

Galilaei is a large impact crater on Mars in the region known as Margaritifer Terra. The crater is in the southern part of the Oxia Palus quadrangle (MC-11) at 5.7°N 333.0°E. Galilaei is located north of Hydaspis Chaos in the area east of Tiu Valles and west of Ares Vallis. The crater was named after the Italian astronomer and physicist Galileo Galilei. Galilaei is one of the numerous large craters that formed during the Noachian Period, which ended around 3.7 billion years ago. The crater floor was modified by superficial geologic processes through Late Hesperian time, as mapped by Tanaka, K.L. and others.

== Characterics ==
Galilaei has a highly degraded rim and lacks recognizable ejecta. The crater is 137 km (85 mi) in diameter and has a relatively flat floor that lies 3 km below the martian elevation datum. The crater is in a low-lying part of Mars where there are many channels, chaos zones, and craters with outlet channels that provide evidence for climate variability and surface flooding.

The crater has an outlet channel named Tana Vallis, which shows that Galilaei once contained a crater lake that overtopped its rim, producing an overland flood. This flood likely occurred in Late Hesperian time based on the units that were eroded by the terminus of Tana Vallis. Based on Mars Orbiter Laser Altimetry data, the drainable volume of that crater lake was >11,000 cubic km (2600 cubic miles). That volume equals 90% of that contained in Lake Superior of the Great Lakes.

Tana Vallis is 60 km (37 miles) long and begins at the southwest rim of Galilaei Crater. Tana was eroded by the catastrophic drainage of a lake that formerly filled the crater, overtopped its rim, and rapidly eroded a breach channel through which the lake in Galilaei Crater drained. Terrestrial dam breach methods were used to estimate paleo-discharges in Tana Vallis. Peak discharge rates in Tana Vallis would have depended on how quickly the breach channel formed. If it fully formed in two to ten days, the discharge peak would have been in the range from 15 to 47 million cubic meters per second. A key erosion parameter, stream power, has also been evaluated for Tana Vallis. For a scenario where the breach formed in five days, the stream power per unit stream bed area at the time of peak discharge would have exceeded 350,000 watts per square meter. Erosive power of this magnitude would have sufficed to erode basaltic bedrock. The impact-altered material in the rim of Galilaei Crater would have been more easily eroded than intact basalts, and therefore the breach channel would have formed relatively fast.
