= List of areas of chaos terrain on Mars =

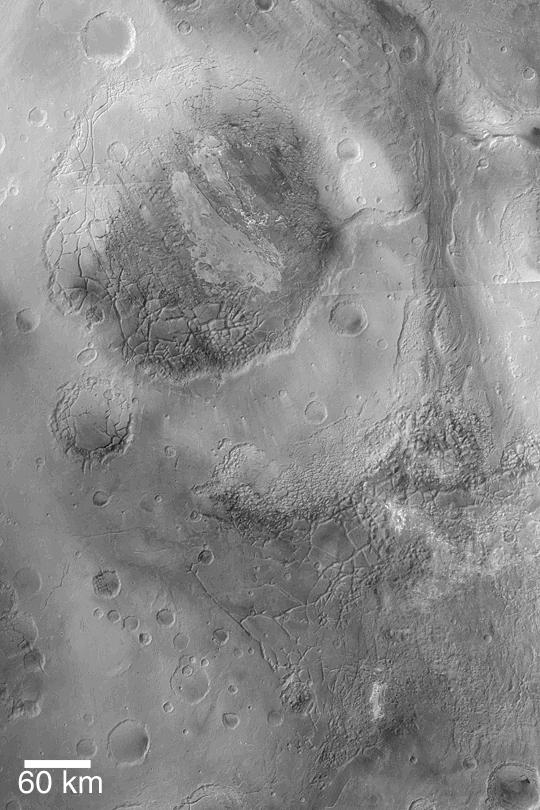
In this mosaic taken by the Mars Global Surveyor, Aram Chaos lies in the upper left and Iani Chaos in the lower right.

This is a list of areas of chaos terrain officially named by the International Astronomical Union on the planet Mars. Chaos terrain (or chaotic terrain) is an astrogeological term used to denote planetary surface areas where features such as ridges, cracks, and plains appear jumbled and enmeshed with one another. Coordinates are in planetocentric latitude with east longitude.

Areas of chaos terrain are usually named after a nearby albedo feature as in line with the IAU's rules on planetary nomenclature. Such an albedo feature must feature on the maps of Mars made by either Giovanni Schiaparelli or Eugène Michel Antoniadi and are listed at Classical albedo features on Mars.

Chaos	Coordinates	Diameter (km)	Approval date	Named after	Ref
Aeolis Chaos	7.13°S 150.6°W	201	2018	Classical albedo feature name	WGPSN
Aram Chaos	2.52°N 337.61°E	283.81	1976	Classical albedo feature name	WGPSN
Aromatum Chaos	1.03°S 317.03°E	72.8	1979	Classical albedo feature name	WGPSN
Arsinoes Chaos	7.66°S 332.08°E	200.08	1982	Daughter of Ptolemy Lagun and Bernice	WGPSN
Atlantis Chaos	34.28°S 182.69°E	181.37	1985	From albedo feature at 30N, 173W	WGPSN
Aureum Chaos	3.89°S 333.04°E	351.03	1976	Classical albedo feature name	WGPSN
Aurorae Chaos	8.47°S 325.19°E	713.92	1991	Classical albedo name	WGPSN
Baetis Chaos	0.17°S 299.6°E	66.66	2006	Classical albedo feature name	WGPSN
Candor Chaos	6.94°S 287.42°E	0	1985	From albedo feature at 5N, 75W	WGPSN
Caralis Chaos	37.2°S 178.6°E	103.35	2014	Classical albedo feature name	WGPSN
Chryse Chaos	9.86°N 322.81°E	658.89	2008	Classical albedo feature name	WGPSN
Echus Chaos	10.79°N 285.28°E	480.51	1985	Classical albedo feature name	WGPSN
Eos Chaos	16.82°S 313.48°E	497.85	1982	Classical albedo feature name	WGPSN
Erythraeum Chaos	21.84°S 347.62°W	147.63	2007	Classical albedo feature name	WGPSN
Galaxias Chaos	33.83°S 347.62°E	234.48	1985	Albedo feature name	WGPSN
Ganges Chaos	9.76°S 313.96°W	113.73	2006	Classical albedo feature name	WGPSN
Gorgonum Chaos	37.26°S 189.1°E	150.71	1985	From albedo feature at 24S, 154W	WGPSN
Hellas Chaos	47.12°S 64.41°W	590.62	1994	Named for albedo feature Hellas	WGPSN
Hydaspis Chaos	3.09°N 333.07°E	336.04	1976	Classical albedo feature name	WGPSN
Hydrae Chaos	5.9°S 300.03°E	66	2014	Classical albedo feature name	WGPSN
Hydraotes Chaos	1.12°N 324.71°E	419.04	1976	Classical albedo feature name	WGPSN
Iamuna Chaos	0.28°S 319.39°E	21.72	2006	Classical albedo feature name	WGPSN
Iani Chaos	2.19°S 342.96°E	450.51	1976	Classical albedo feature name	WGPSN
Ister Chaos	12.95°N 303.44°E	109.1	1985	From classical albedo feature at 10N, 56W	WGPSN
Margaritifer Chaos	9.3°S 338.3°E	383.67	1976	Classical albedo feature name	WGPSN
Nia Chaos	6.74°S 292.62°E	48	2017	Classical albedo feature name	WGPSN
Nilus Chaos	25.39°N 283.05°E	283	1985	Named for albedo feature at 20N, 65W	WGPSN
Oxia Chaos	0.22°N 320.13°E	24.12	2006	Classical albedo feature name	WGPSN
Pyrrhae Chaos	10.46°S 331.6°W	162.35	1982	Albedo feature name	WGPSN
Xanthe Chaos	11.87°N 317.78°E	34.37	2006	Classical albedo feature name	WGPSN
