= Galaxias Chaos =

Chaos on Mars

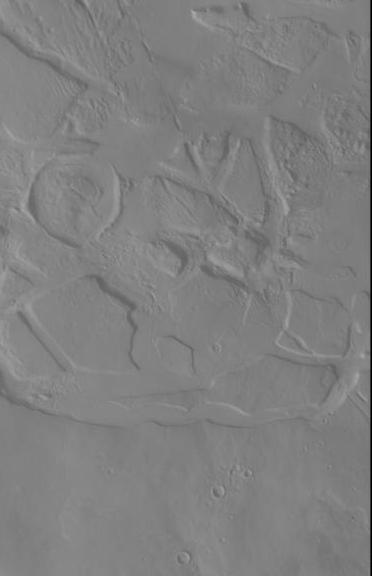
- Galaxias Chaos as seen by CTX. The scene in the next image is a part of this picture.
- Coordinates: 34.1°N 213.6°W

Galaxias Chaos is an area of broken landscape in the Cebrenia quadrangle of Mars, located at 34.1° N and 213.6° W. It is 234.0 km across and was named after an albedo feature name. Galaxias Chaos may be caused by sublimation of an ice-rich deposit.

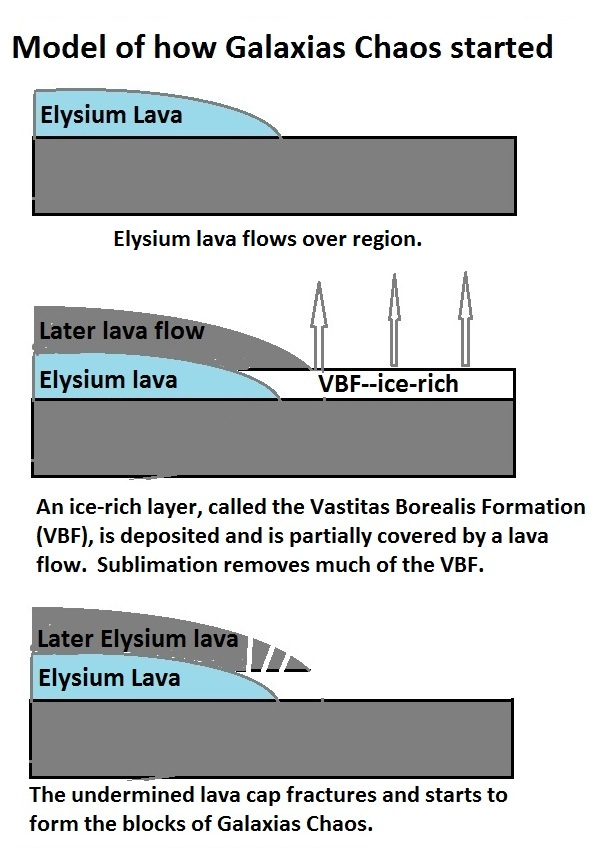
This series of drawings show another model for the formation of Martian chaos, as proposed by Pedersen and Head 2011. Amount of sublimation is exaggerated to improve understanding. Click on image to see more details.

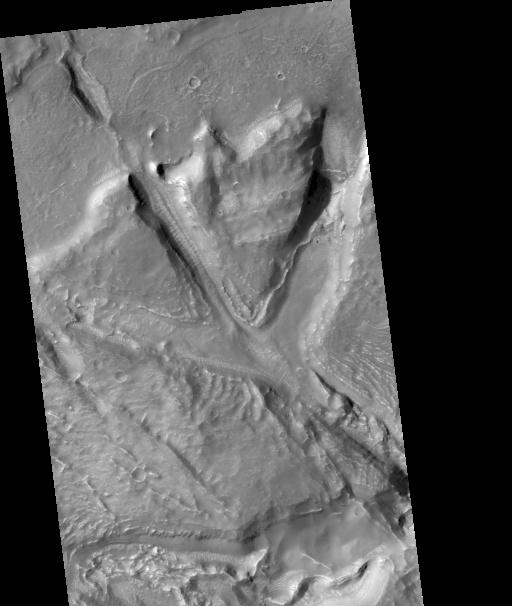
Galaxias Chaos as seen by HiRISE.

== See also ==
- Chaos terrain
- Climate of Mars
- Geology of Mars
- List of areas of chaos terrain on Mars
- Martian chaos terrain
- Outflow channels
- Water on Mars
