= Galilei ja kadonneet lelut =

1997 video game

- Developer: Mediayhtiö Sansibar Oy
- Platform: Windows
- Release: 1997
- Mode: Single-player

Galilei ja kadonneet lelut (Galilei and the Missing Toys) is a 1997 Finnish video game based on the children's television program of the same name that aired on Yle TV2. The franchise's main character, Galilei, is created by the writer and animator Mikko Kunnas. A sequel for the game, Galilei 2: Seikkailujen saari, was released in 2000. Galilei 2 received a score of eight out of ten from Tilt.
