= HiRISE =

Camera on board the Mars Reconnaissance Orbiter

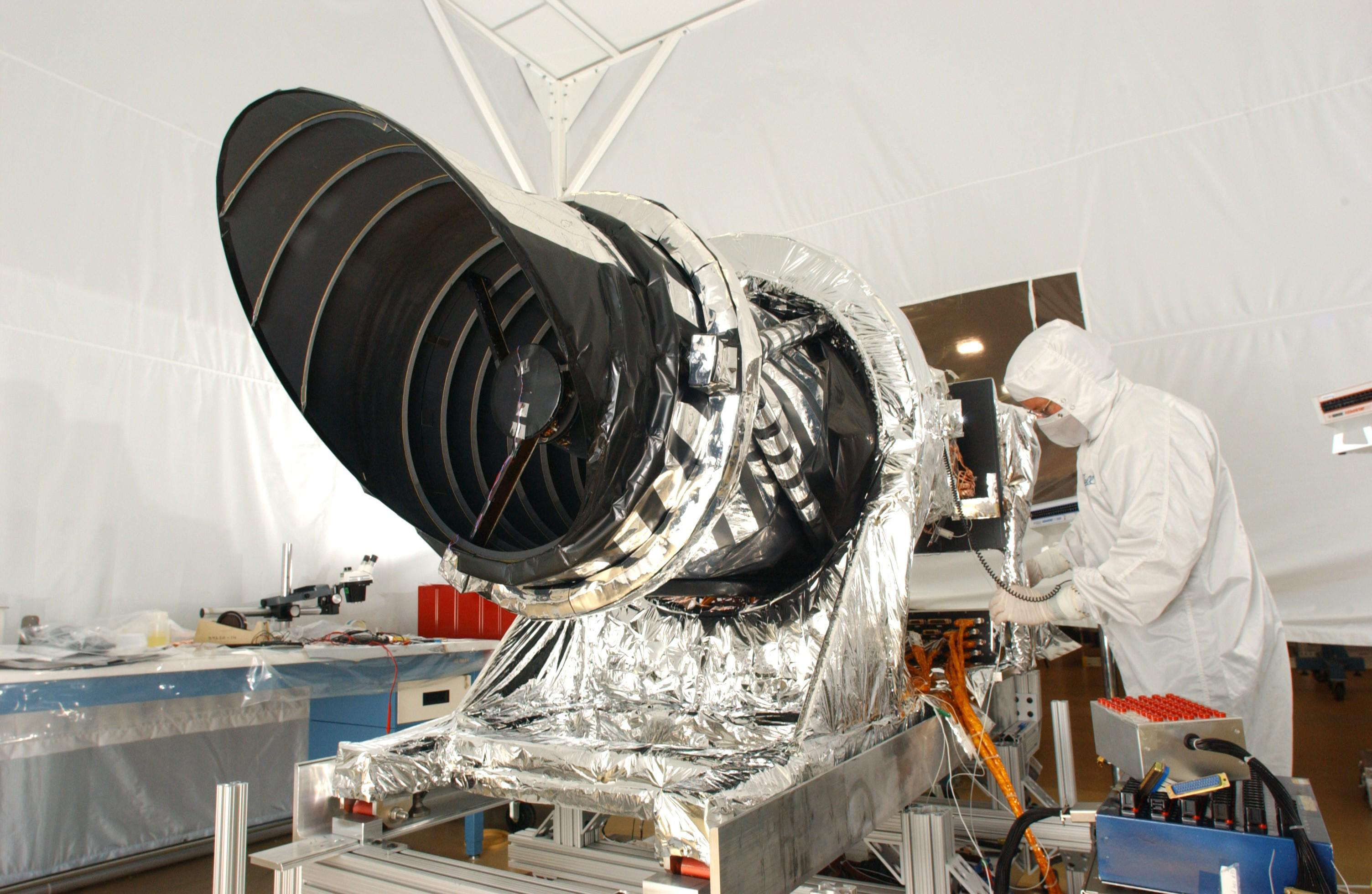
- Alternative names: High Resolution Imaging Science Experiment
- First light: March 10, 2006
- Diameter: 0.5 m
- Length: 1.6 m (5 ft 3 in)
- Mass: 64.2 kg (142 lb)
- Focal length: 12 m (39 ft 4 in)
- Website: hirise.lpl.arizona.edu
- Related media on Commons

High Resolution Imaging Science Experiment is a camera on board the Mars Reconnaissance Orbiter which has been orbiting and studying Mars since 2006. The 65 kg (143 lb), US$40 million instrument was built under the direction of the University of Arizona's Lunar and Planetary Laboratory by Ball Aerospace & Technologies Corp. It consists of a 0.5 m (19.7 in) aperture reflecting telescope, the largest so far of any deep space mission, which allows it to take pictures of Mars with resolutions of 0.3 m/pixel (1 ft/pixel), resolving objects below a meter across.

HiRISE has imaged Mars exploration rovers on the surface, including the Opportunity rover and the ongoing Curiosity mission.

== History ==
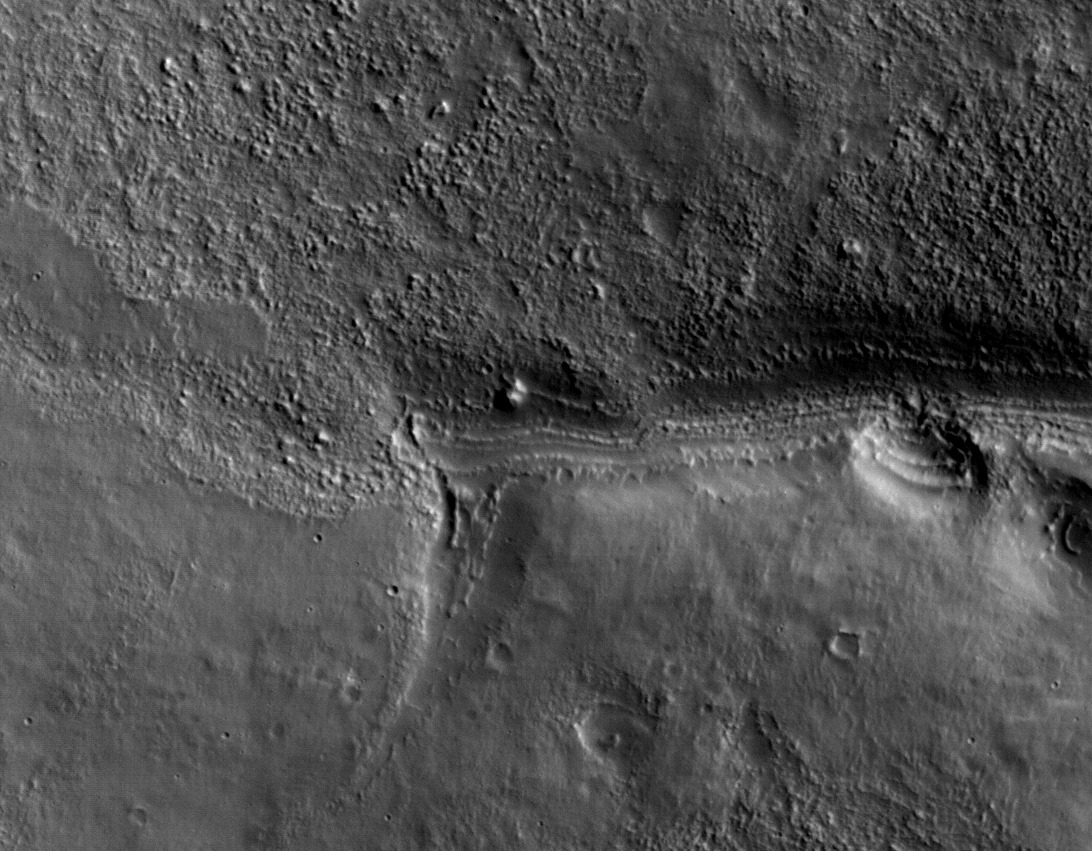
Crop of one of the first images of Mars from the HiRISE camera

In the late 1980s, Alan Delamere of Ball Aerospace & Technologies began planning the kind of high-resolution imaging needed to support sample return and surface exploration of Mars. In early 2001 he teamed up with Alfred McEwen of the University of Arizona to propose such a camera for the Mars Reconnaissance Orbiter (MRO), and NASA formally accepted it November 9, 2001.

Ball Aerospace was given the responsibility to build the camera and they delivered HiRISE to NASA on December 6, 2004 for integration with the rest of the spacecraft. It was prepared for launch on board the MRO on August 12, 2005, to the cheers of the HiRISE team who were present.

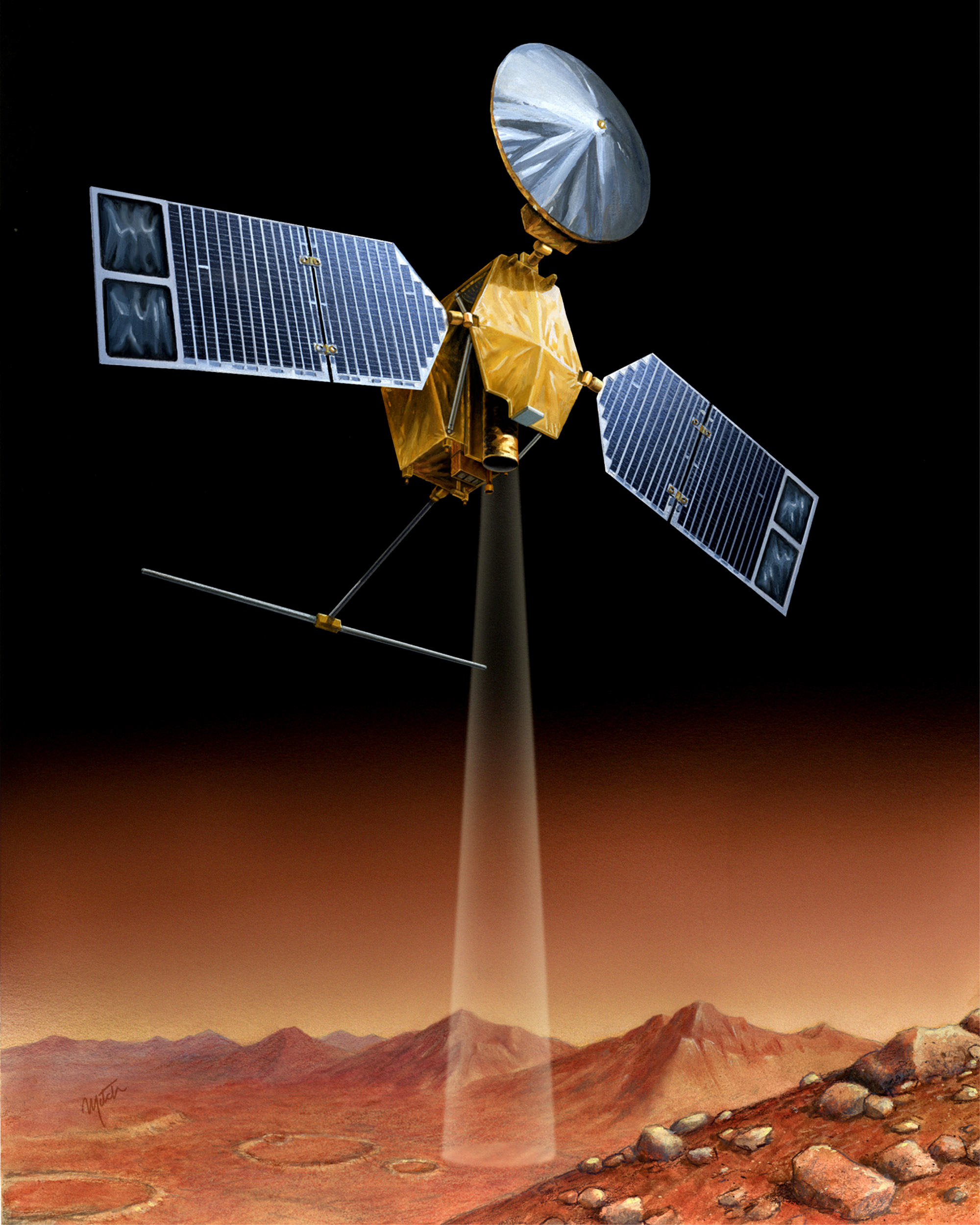
Artist's rendition of HiRISE at Mars

During the cruise phase of MRO, HiRISE took multiple test shots including several of the Moon and the Jewel Box cluster. These images helped to calibrate the camera and prepare it for taking pictures of Mars.

On March 10, 2006, MRO achieved Martian orbit and primed HiRISE to acquire some initial images of Mars. The instrument had two opportunities to take pictures of Mars (the first was on March 24, 2006) before MRO entered aerobraking, during which time the camera was turned off for six months. It was turned on successfully on September 27, and took its first high-resolution pictures of Mars on September 29.

On October 6, 2006 HiRISE took the first image of Victoria Crater, a site which was also under study by the Opportunity rover.

In February 2007 seven detectors showed signs of degradation, with one IR channel almost completely degraded, and one other showing advanced signs of degradation. The problems seemed to disappear when higher temperatures were used to take pictures with the camera. As of March, the degradation appeared to have stabilized, but the underlying cause remained unknown. Subsequent experiments with the Engineering Model (EM) at Ball Aerospace provided definitive evidence for the cause: contamination in the analog-to-digital converters (ADCs) which results in flipping bits to create the apparent noise or bad data in the images, combined with design flaws leading to delivery of poor analog waveforms to the ADCs. Further work showed that the degradation can be reversed by heating the ADCs.

On October 3, 2007, HiRISE was turned toward Earth, and took a picture of it and the Moon. In the full-resolution color image, Earth was 90 pixels across and the Moon was 24 pixels across from a distance of 142 million km.

On May 25, 2008, HiRISE imaged NASA's Mars Phoenix Lander parachuting down to the surface of Mars. It was the first time that one spacecraft imaged the final descent of another spacecraft onto a planetary body.

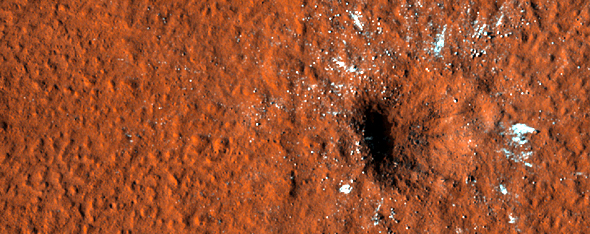
A fresh impact crater in Amazonis Planitia (HiRISE Image ESP 073077 2155)

By 2010, HiRISE had imaged only about one percent of Mars's surface and by 2016 the coverage was around 2.4%. It was designed to capture smaller areas at high resolution—other instruments scan much more area to find things like fresh impact craters. MRO's Context Camera (CTX) captured two fresh impact craters (>130 meter each) formed on Mars in late 2021, the largest discovered by MRO. These seismic events were also detected by Interior Exploration using Seismic Investigations, Geodesy and Heat Transport (InSight). The crater in Amazonis Planitia was discovered independently by both missions, while the crater in Tempe Terra was first observed by Insight and then searched for with CTX images. This identification further allowed development of new techniques by which ice deposits in the future could be characterised by HiRISE color.

On April 1, 2010, NASA released the first images under the HiWish program in which the public suggested places for HiRISE to photograph. One of the eight locations was Aureum Chaos. The first image below gives a wide view of the area. The next two images are from the HiRISE image.

The following three images are among the first images taken under the HiWish program. The first is a context image from CTX to show where the HiRISE is looking.

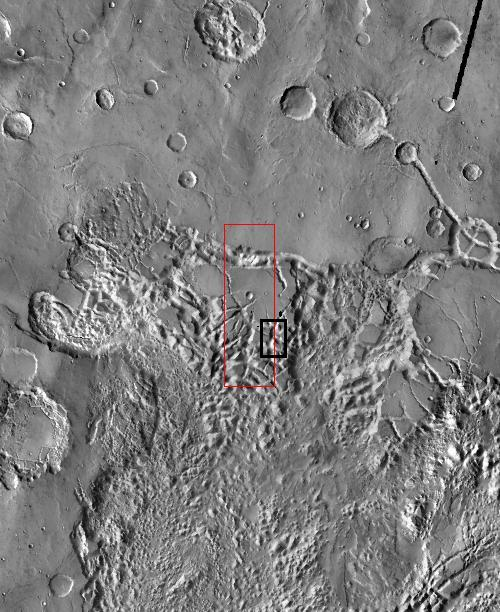
THEMIS image of wide view of following HiRISE images. Black box shows approximate location of HiRISE images. This image is just a part of the vast area known as Aureum Chaos. Click on image to see more details.

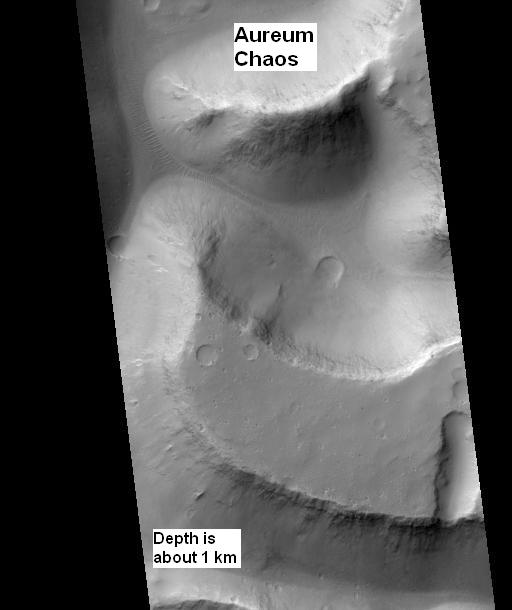
Aureum Chaos, as seen by HiRISE, under the HiWish program. Image is located in Margaritifer Sinus quadrangle.

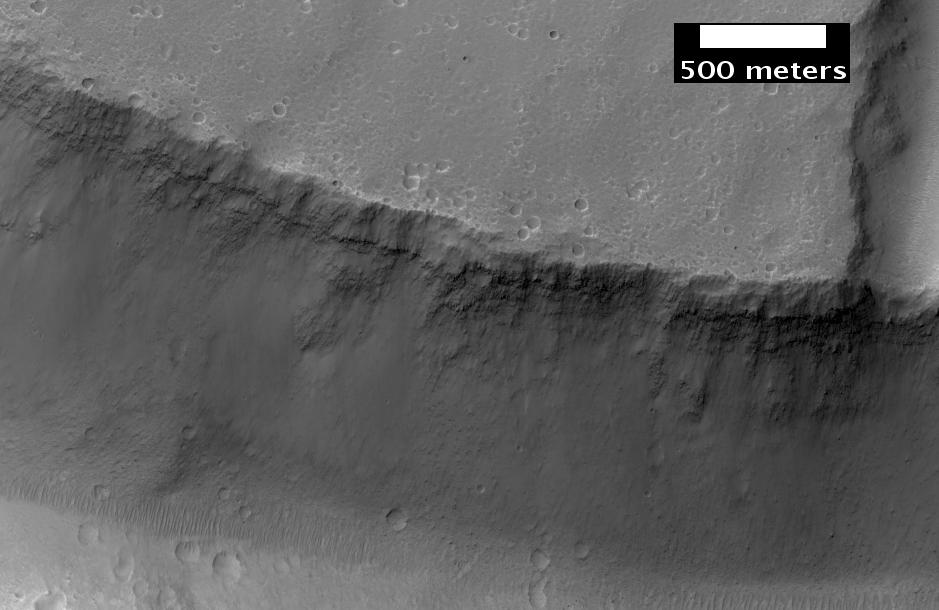
Close up view of previous image, as seen by HiRISE under HiWish program. Small round dots are boulders.

== Examples of HiRISE images ==
The following group of images show some significant images taken by the instrument. Some of these hint at possible sources of water for future colonists.

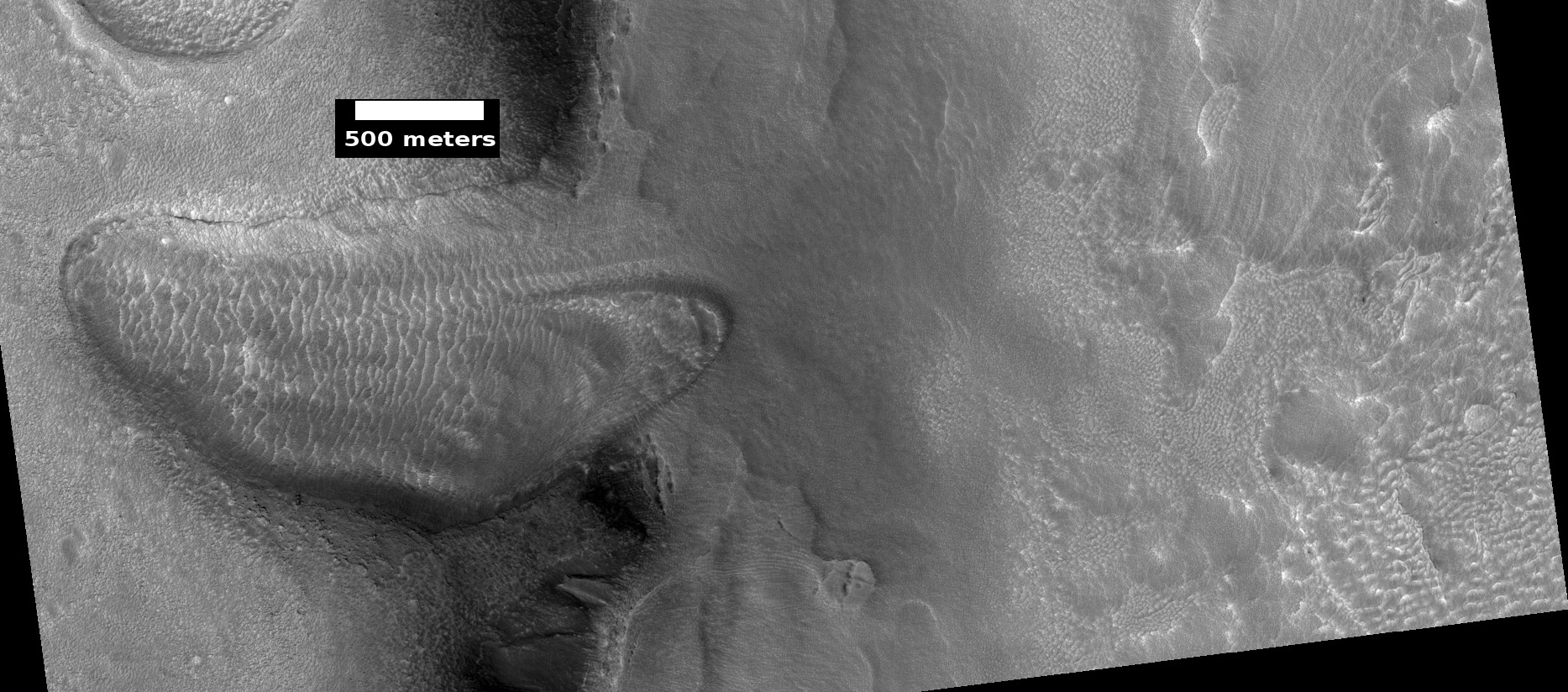
Glacier moving out of valley, as seen by HiRISE under HiWish program Location is Ismenius Lacus quadrangle.

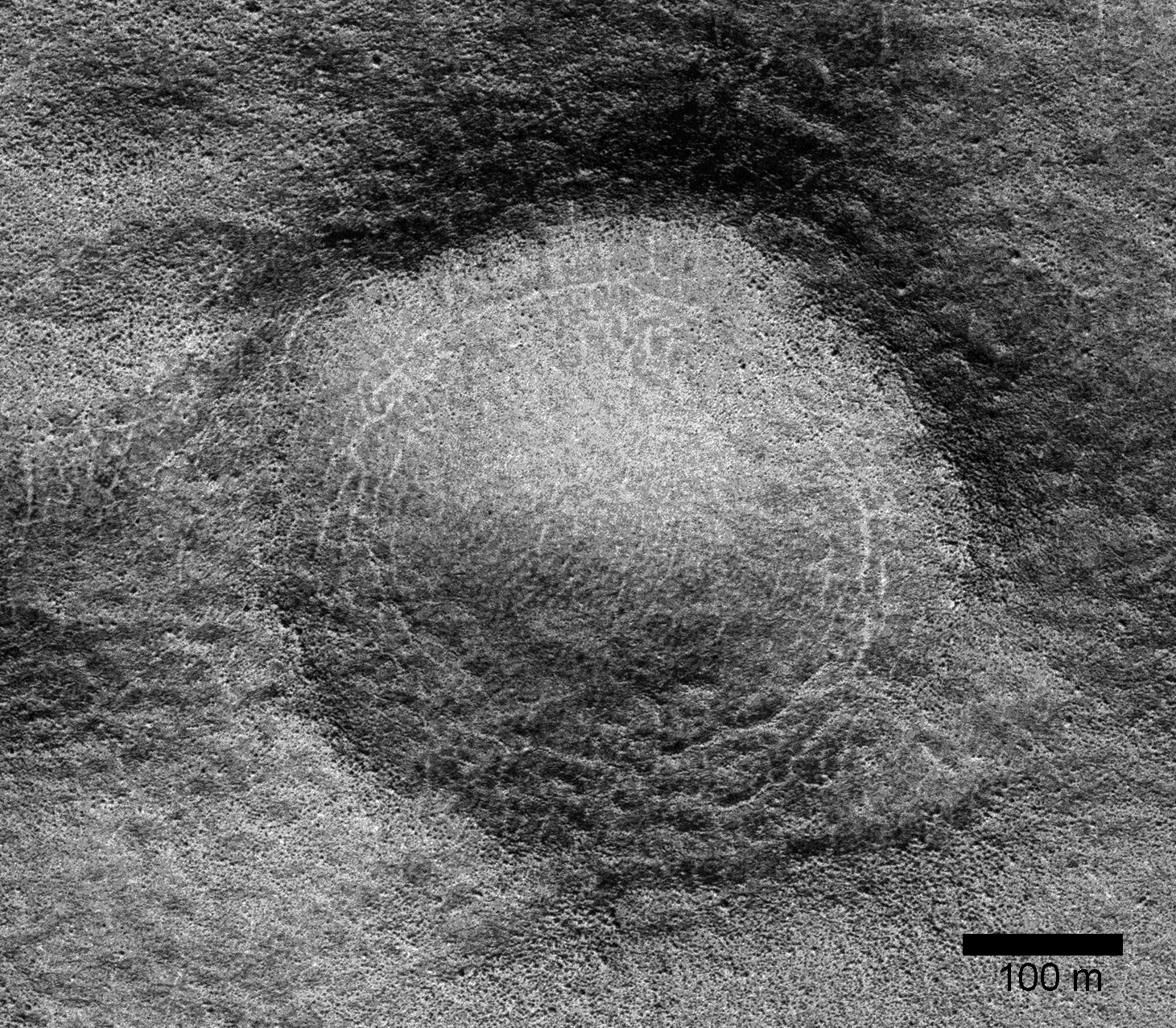
Close view of possible pingo with scale, as seen by HiRISE under HiWish program Pingos may contain a core of pure ice.

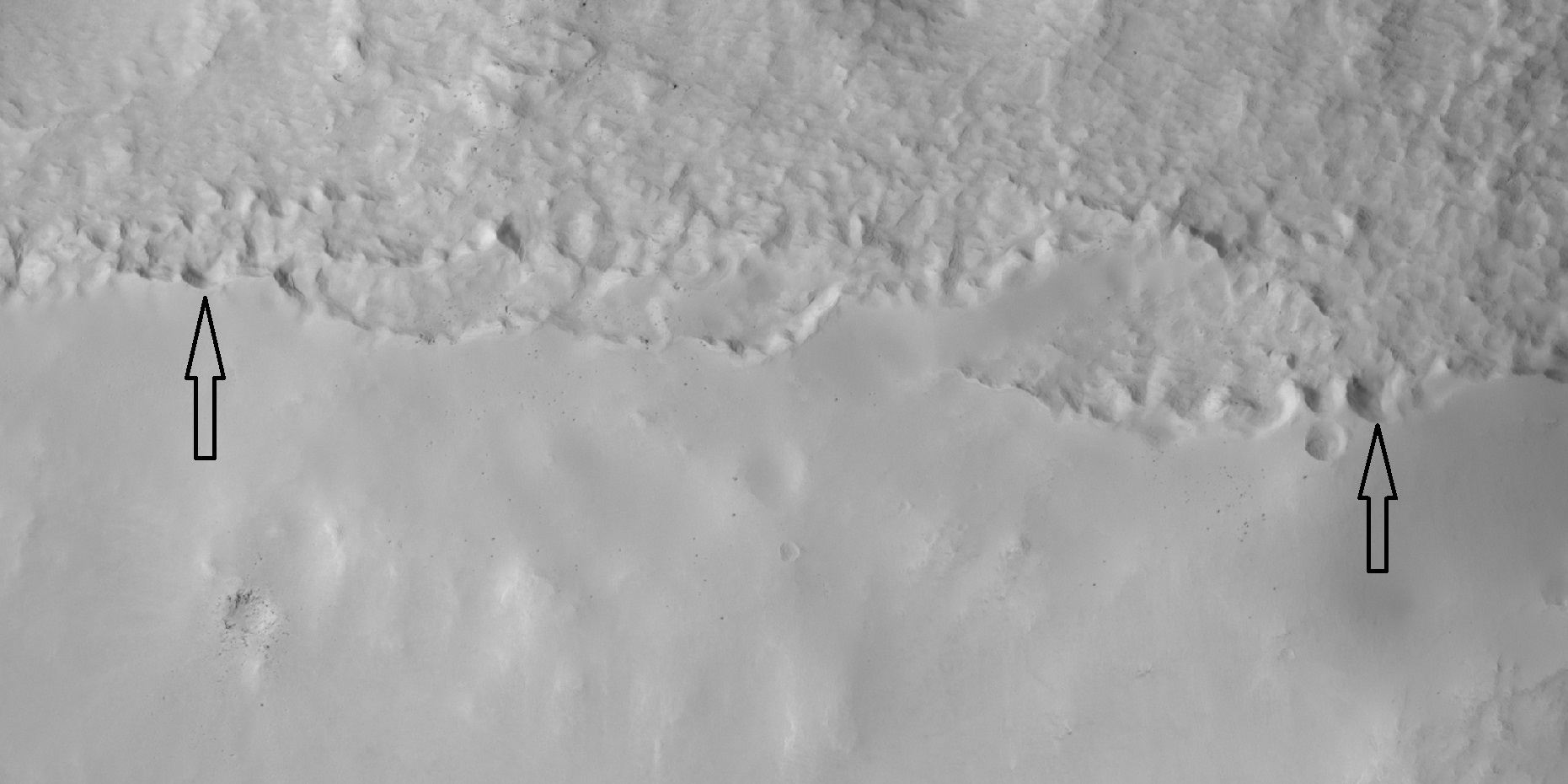
Close view of mantle, as seen by HiRISE under HiWish program Arrows show craters along edge which highlight the thickness of mantle. Mantle may be used as a water source by future colonists. Location is Ismenius Lacus quadrangle.

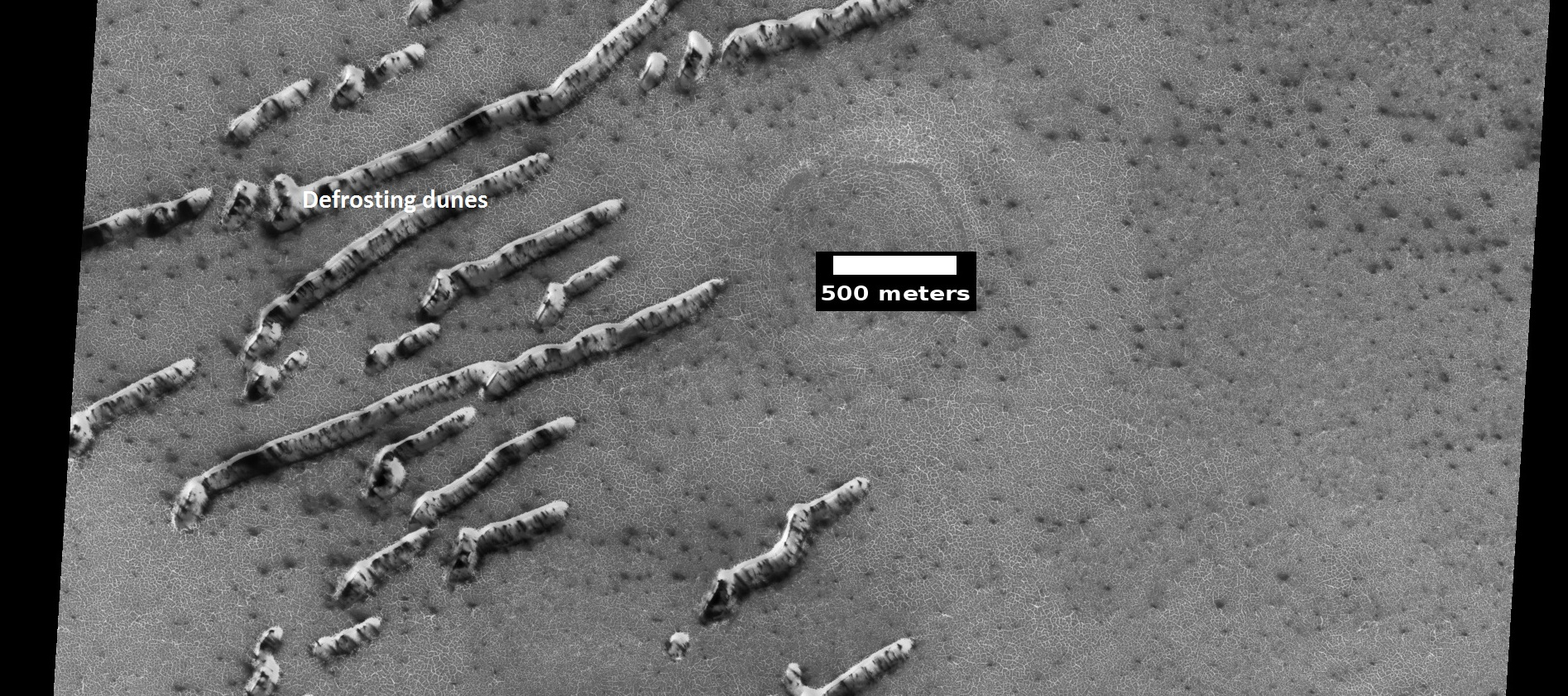
Defrosting dunes and ice in troughs of polygons, as seen by HiRISE under HiWish program

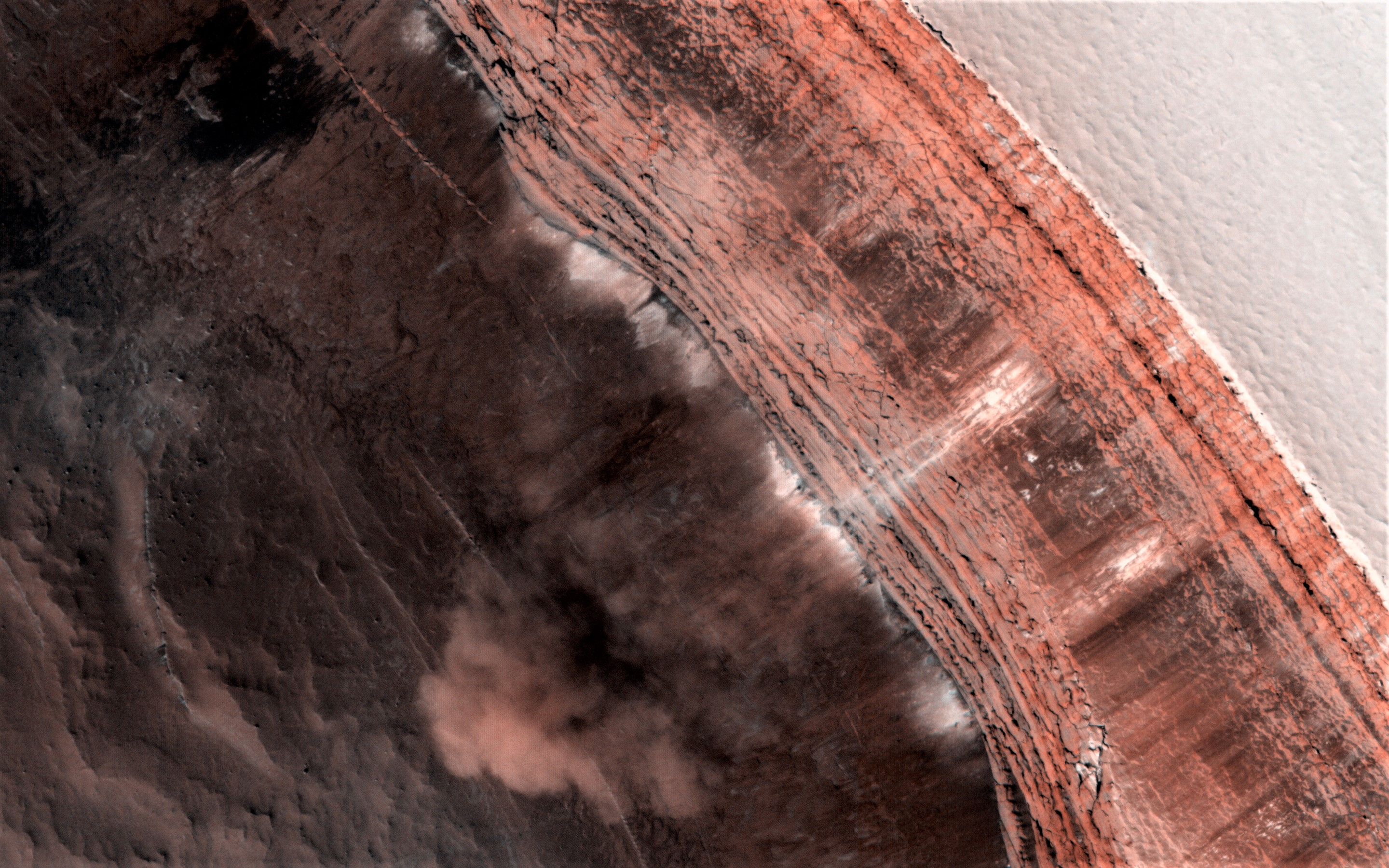
False color view of a Martian avalanche

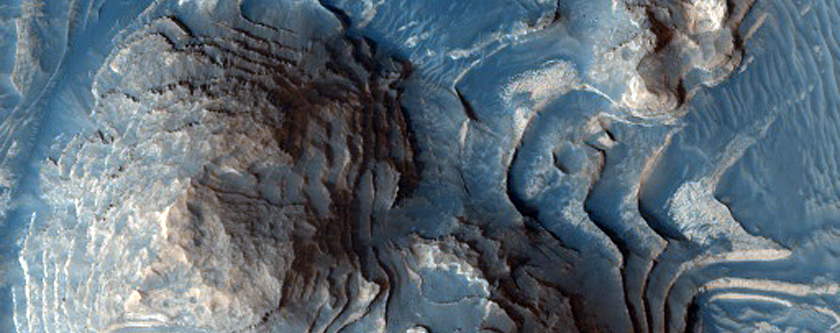
Close-up of layers in Firsoff Crater, as seen by HiRISE Layers may have been created with the aid of water.

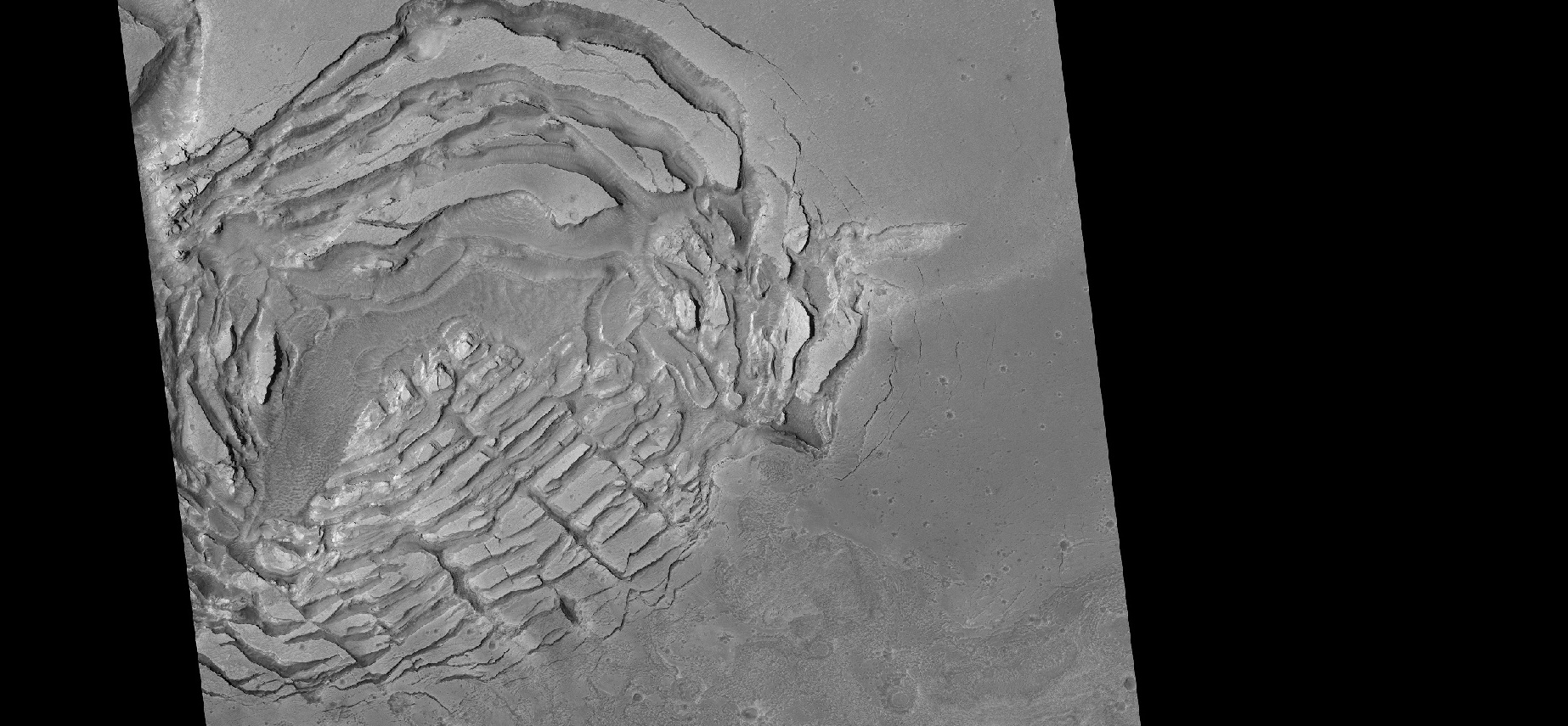
Large group of concentric cracks, as seen by HiRISE, under HiWish program Location is Ismenius Lacus quadrangle. Cracks were formed by a volcano under ice.

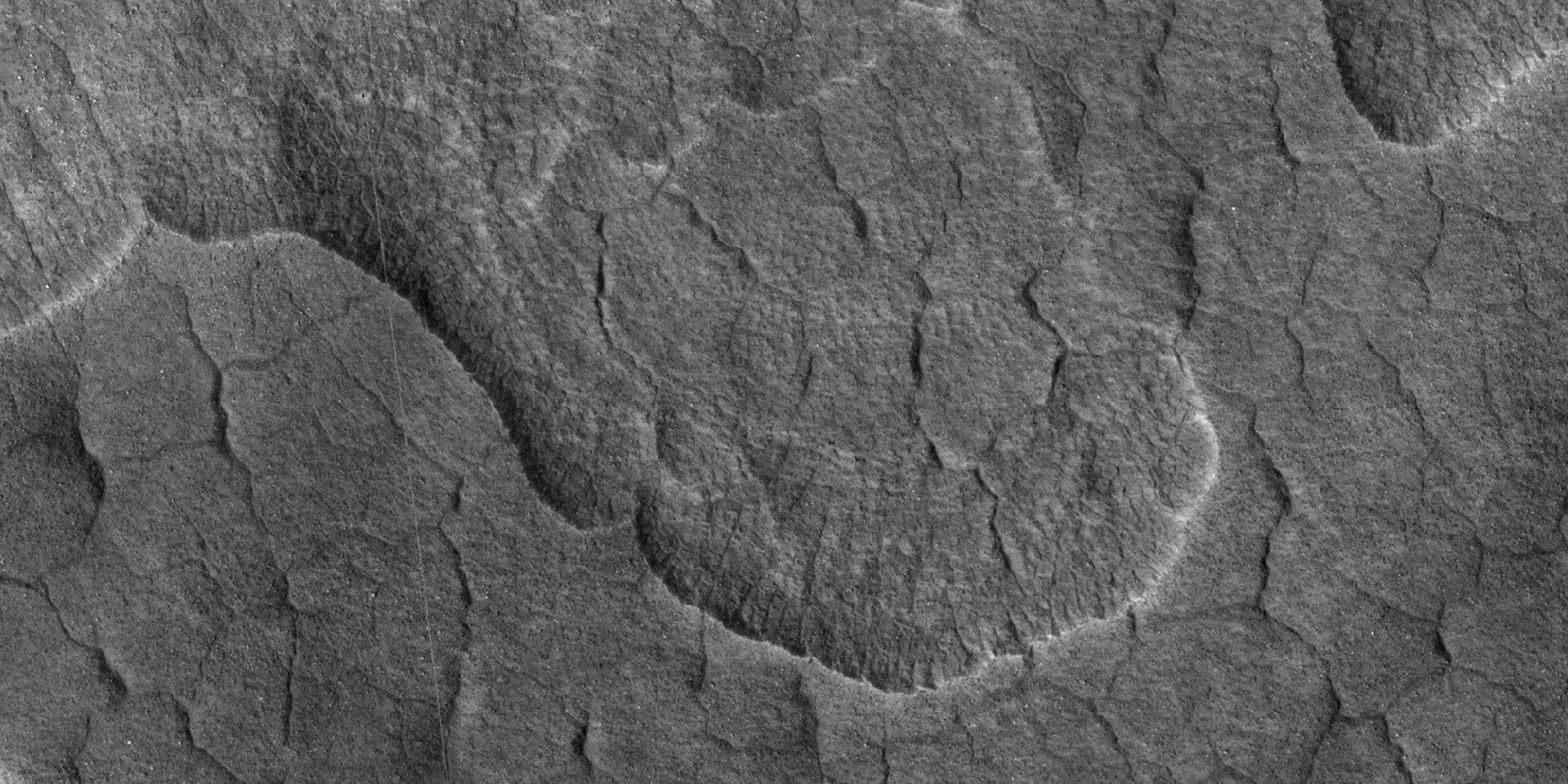
Scalloped terrain, as seen by HiRISE under HiWish program The location is the Casius quadrangle. Studies suggest that there is water-ice in scalloped terrain.

The following set of pictures show first a full image of a scene and then enlargements from parts of it. A program called HiView can be used to produce more detailed views. Some pictures are in color. HiRISE takes a color strip down the middle only.

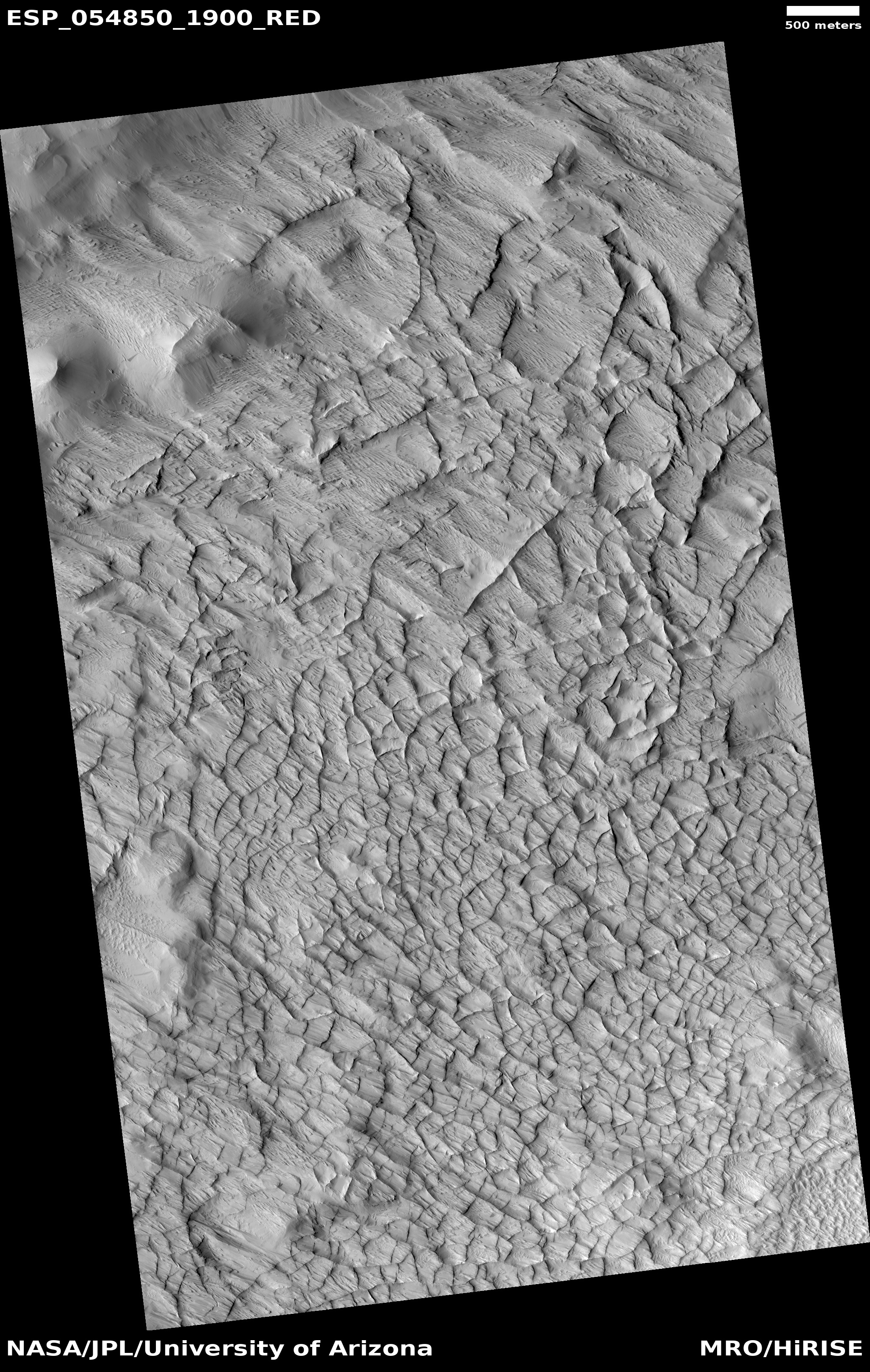
Wide view of large ridge network, as seen by HiRISE under HiWish program

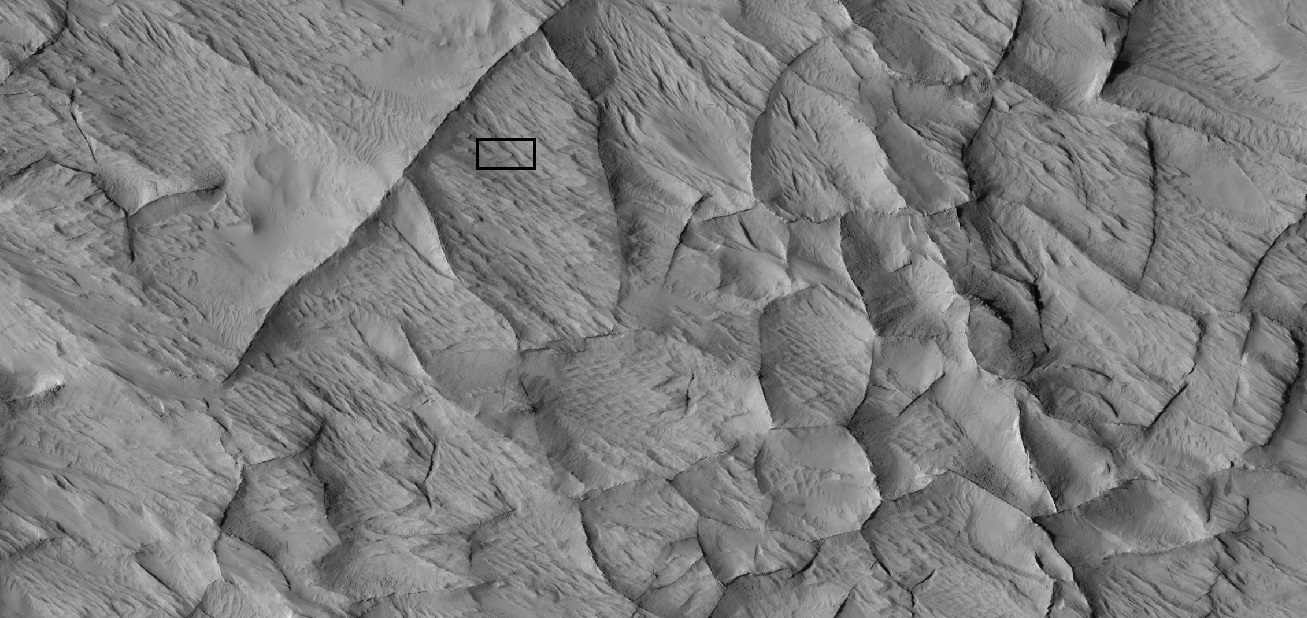
Close view of ridge network, as seen by HiRISE under HiWish program Box shows size of football field.

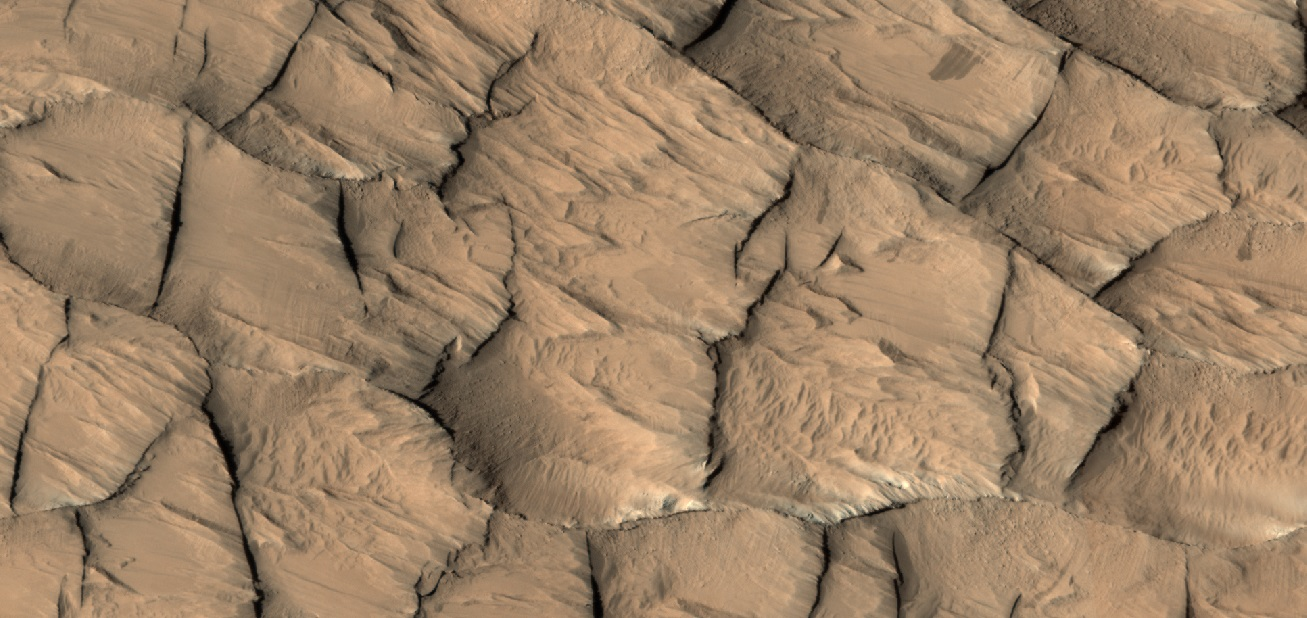
Close, color view of ridges, as seen by HiRISE under HiWish program

== Purpose ==
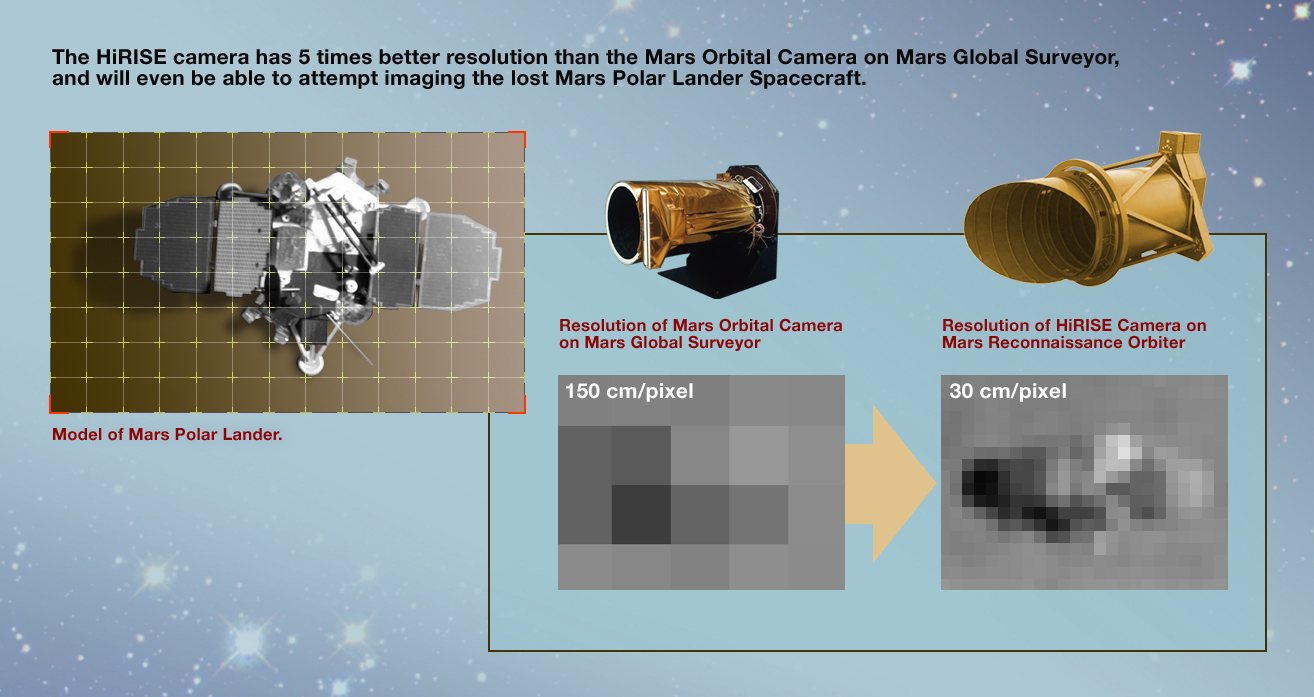
Comparison of resolution of MRO HiRISE camera with predecessor, the MOC aboard MGS

The HiRISE camera is designed to view surface features of Mars in greater detail than has previously been possible. It has provided a closer look at fresh Martian craters, revealing alluvial fans, viscous flow features and ponded regions of pitted materials containing breccia clast. This allows for the study of the age of Martian features, looking for landing sites for future Mars landers, and in general, seeing the Martian surface in far greater detail than has previously been done from orbit. By doing so, it is allowing better studies of Martian channels and valleys, volcanic landforms, possible former lakes and oceans, sand dune fields such as Hagal and Nili Patera, and other surface landforms as they exist on the Martian surface.

The general public is allowed to request sites for the HiRISE camera to capture (see HiWish). For this reason, and due to the unprecedented access of pictures to the general public, shortly after they have been received and processed, the camera has been termed "The People's Camera". The pictures can be viewed online, downloaded, or with the free HiView software.

== Design ==
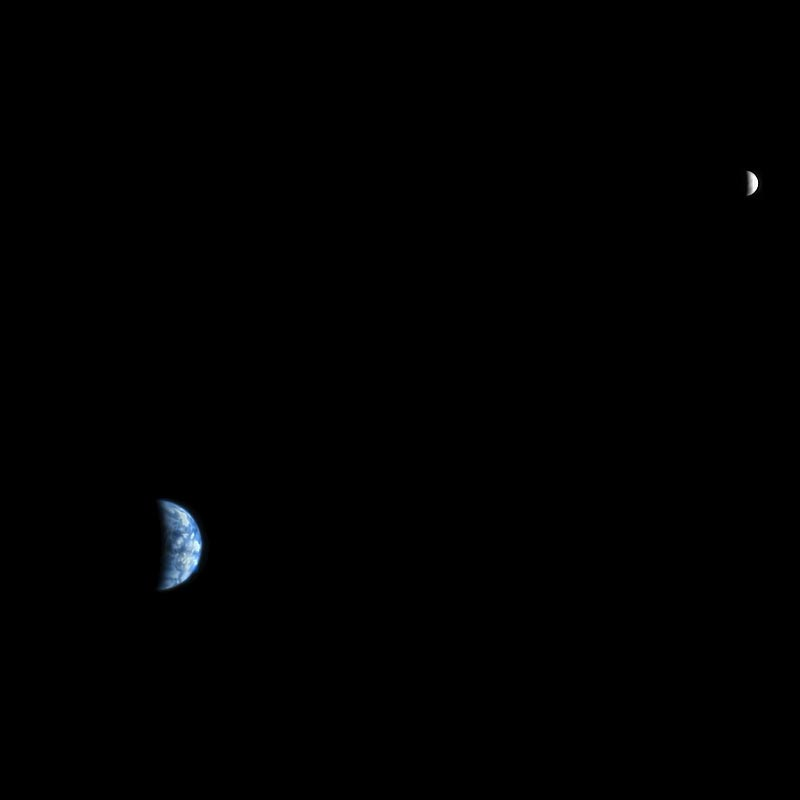
Photograph of Earth and Moon roughly to scale, taken from Mars orbit by HiRISE

HiRISE was designed to be a high resolution camera from the beginning. It consists of a large mirror, as well as a large CCD camera. Because of this, it achieves a resolution of 1 microradian, or 0.3 meter at a height of 300 km. (For comparison purposes, satellite images on Google Mars are available to 1 meter.) It can image in three color bands, 400–600 nm (blue–green or B–G), 550–850 nm (red) and 800–1,000 nm (near infrared or NIR).

HiRISE incorporates a 0.5-meter primary mirror, the largest optical telescope ever sent beyond Earth's orbit. The mass of the instrument is 64.2 kg.

Red color images are at 20,048 pixels wide (6 km in a 300 km orbit), and blue-green and NIR are at 4,048 pixels wide (1.2 km). These are gathered by 14 CCD sensors, 2048 × 128 pixels. HiRISE's onboard computer reads out these lines in time with the orbiter's ground speed, meaning the images are potentially unlimited in height. Practically this is limited by the onboard computer's 28 Gbit (3.5 GB) memory capacity. The nominal maximum size of red images (compressed to 8 bits per pixel) is about 20,000 × 126,000 pixels, or 2520 megapixels and 4,000 × 126,000 pixels (504 megapixels) for the narrower images of the B–G and NIR bands. A single uncompressed image uses up to 28 Gbit. However, these images are transmitted compressed, with a typical maximum size of 11.2 gigabits. These images are released to the general public on the HiRISE website as JPEG 2000.

To facilitate the mapping of potential landing sites, HiRISE can produce stereo pairs of images from which the topography can be measured to an accuracy of 0.25 meter.

== Images naming conventions ==
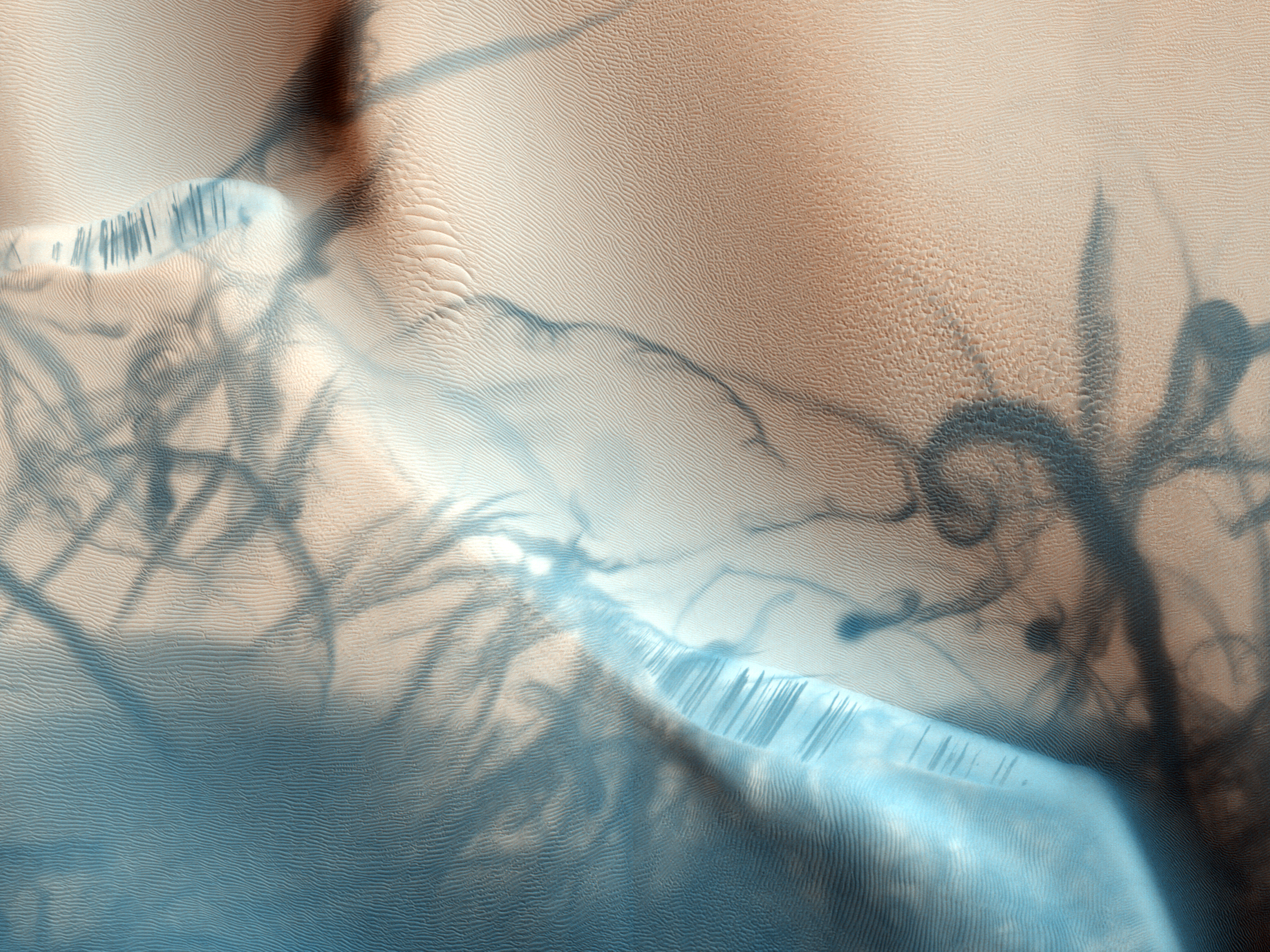
Whirlwind trails on Martian sand dunes

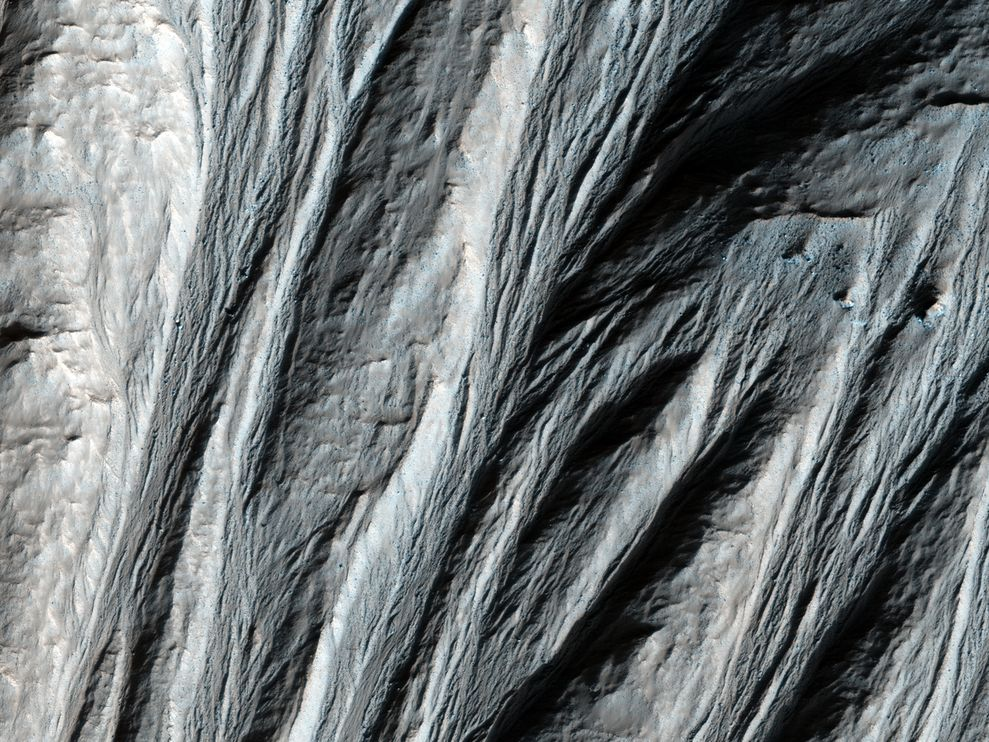
Gullies in the southern highlands of Mars

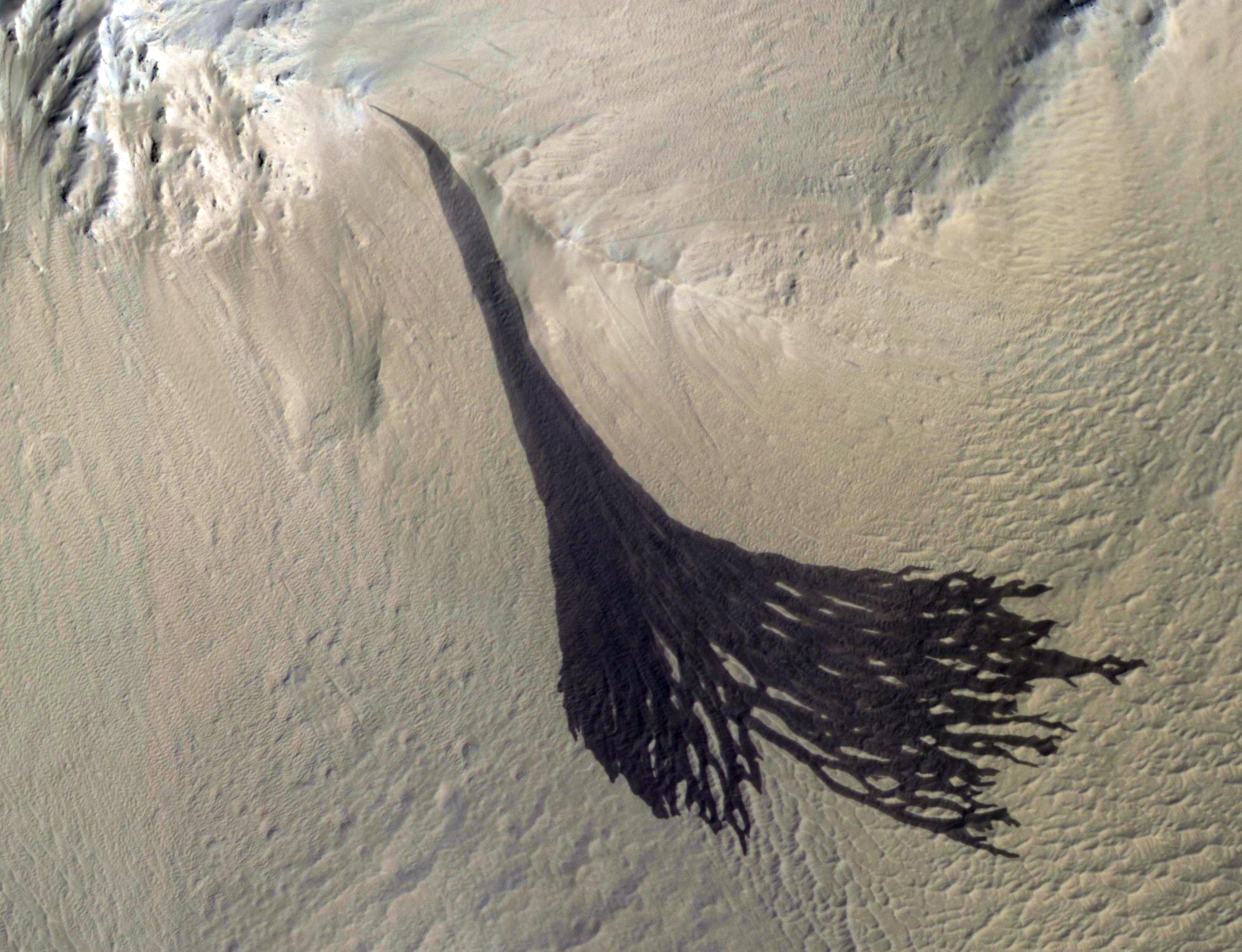
Slope streaks

HiRISE images are available to the public, and are named according to the following rules:

- Name:
- ppp_oooooo_tttt_ffff_c.IMG
- ppp = Mission Phase:
  - INT = Integration and Testing
  - CAL = Calibration Observations
  - ATL = ATLO Observations
  - KSC = Kennedy Space Center Observations
  - SVT = Sequence Verification Test
  - LAU = Launch
  - CRU = Cruise Observations
  - APR = Mars Approach Observations
  - AEB = Aerobraking Phase
  - TRA = Transition Phase
  - PSP = Primary Science Orbit (nov 2006–nov 2008)
  - REL = Relay phase
  - E01 = 1st Extended Mission Phase if needed
  - Exx = Additional extended Missions if needed
- oooooo = MRO orbit number
- tttt = Target code
- ffff Filter/CCD designation:
- RED0-RED9 – Red filter CCDs
- IR10-IR11 – Near-Infrared filter CCDs
- BG12-BG13 – Blue-Green filter CCDs
- c = Channel number of CCD (0 or 1)

The target code refers to the latitudinal position of the center of the planned observation relative to the start of orbit. The start of orbit is located at the equator on the descending side (night side) of the orbit. A target code of 0000 refers to the start of orbit. The target code increases in value along the orbit track ranging from 0000 to 3595. This convention allows the file name ordering to be time sequential. The first three digits refers to the number of whole degrees from the start of orbit, the fourth digit refers to the fractional degrees rounded to the nearest 0.5 degrees. Values greater than 3595 identify observations as off-Mars or special observations.

Examples of target code:

- 0000 – planned observation at the equator on descending side of orbit.
- 0900 – planned observation at the south pole.
- 1800 – planned observation at the equator on the ascending side (day side) of the orbit.
- 2700 – planned observation at the north pole.

Off-Mars and Special Observations Values:

- 4000 – Star Observation
- 4001 – Phobos Observation
- 4002 – Deimos Observation
- 4003 – Special Calibration Observation

== See also ==
- Long Range Reconnaissance Imager (Telescope imager on New Horizon probe)
