= Chaos terrain =

Distinctive area of broken or jumbled terrain

In astrogeology, chaos terrain, or chaotic terrain, is a planetary surface area where features such as ridges, cracks, and plains appear jumbled and enmeshed with one another. Chaos terrain is a notable feature of the planets Mars and Mercury, Jupiter's moon Europa, and the dwarf planet Pluto. In scientific nomenclature, "chaos" is used as a component of proper nouns (e.g., "Aureum Chaos" on Mars).

== On Mars ==
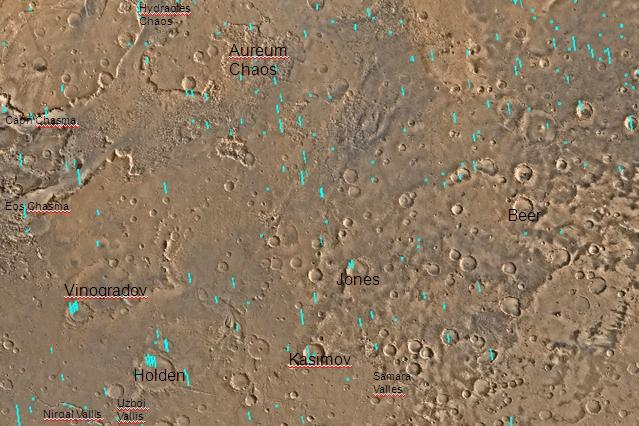
Map of Margaritifer Sinus quadrangle with major features labeled. Aureum Chaos is near the top of the map.

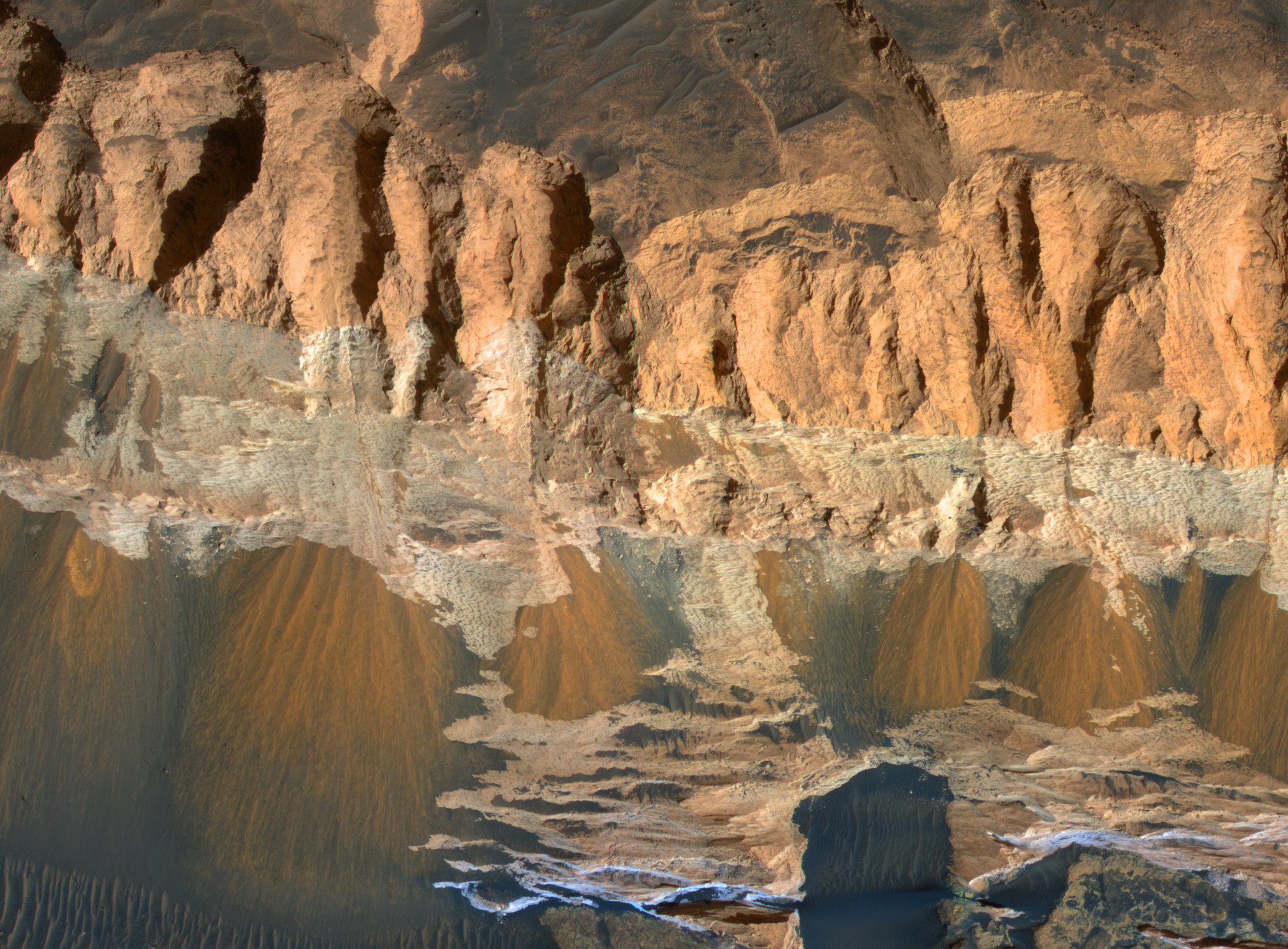
Badlands of Aram Chaos

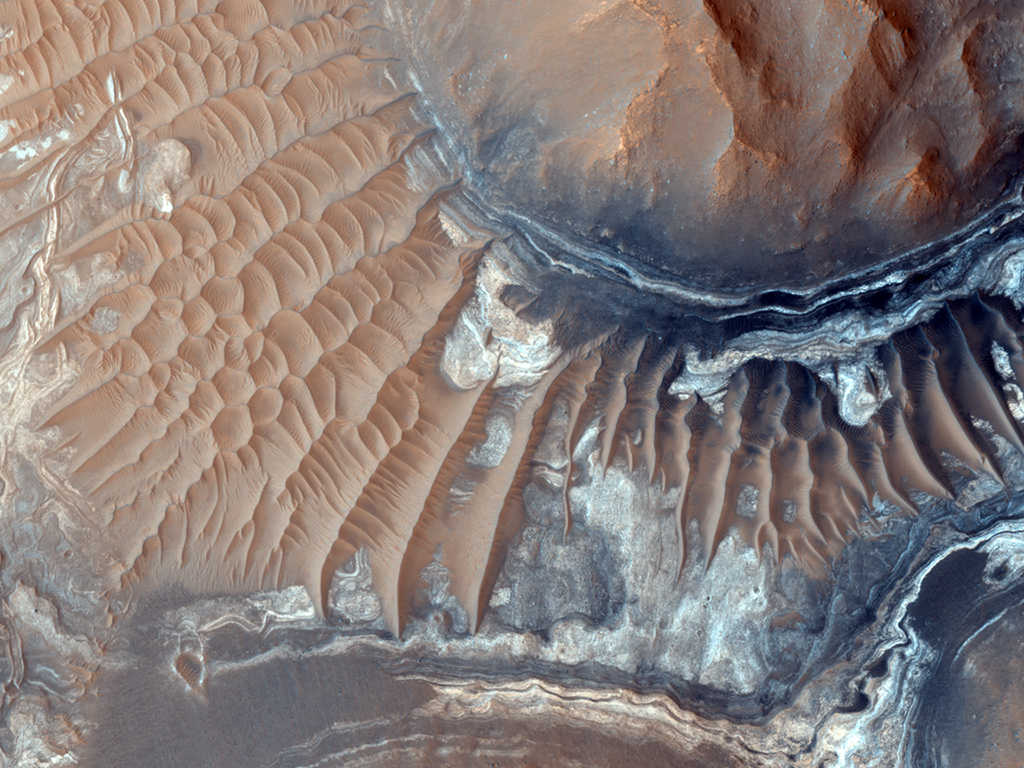
Eastern floor of Aram Chaos

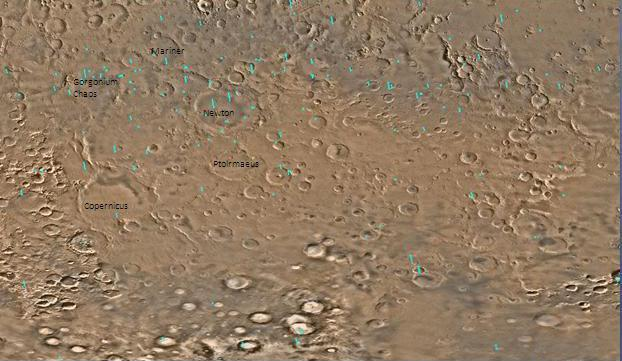
Map of Phaethontis quadrangle. Click to enlarge and see some crater names. Gorgonum Chaos is near the top of the map.

On April 1, 2010, NASA released the first images under the HiWish program in which citizens suggested places for HiRISE to photograph. One of the eight locations was Aureum Chaos. The first image below gives a wide view of the area. The next two images are from the HiRISE image.

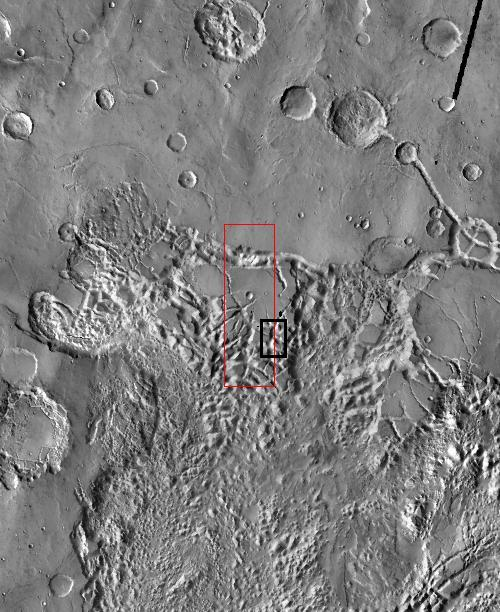
THEMIS image of wide view of following HiRISE images. Black box shows approximate location of HiRISE images. This image is just a part of the vast area known as Aureum Chaos. Click on image to see more details.

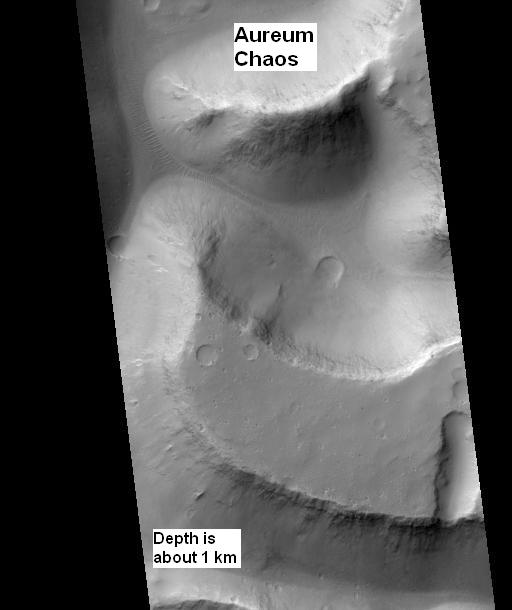
Aureum Chaos, as seen by HiRISE, under the HiWish program.

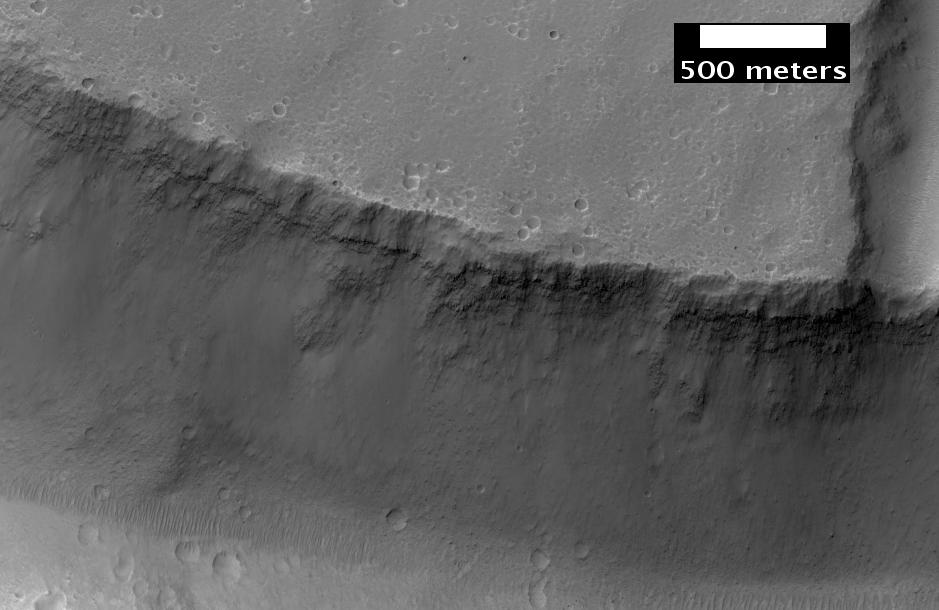
Close up view of previous image, as seen by HiRISE under HiWish program. Small round dots are boulders.

== On Mercury ==
On Mercury, chaos terrain can be hilly or lineated. An original hypothesis for the formation of chaos terrain on Mercury is an impact basin on the opposite side of the planet. However, there is some terrain on Mercury that has no connections to an impact basin, so this hypthesis does not fully explain Mercury's chaos terrain.

A large portion of chaos terrain on Mercury is antipodal to the Caloris basin. They are the result of the ejecta and resurfacing caused by such a large impact.

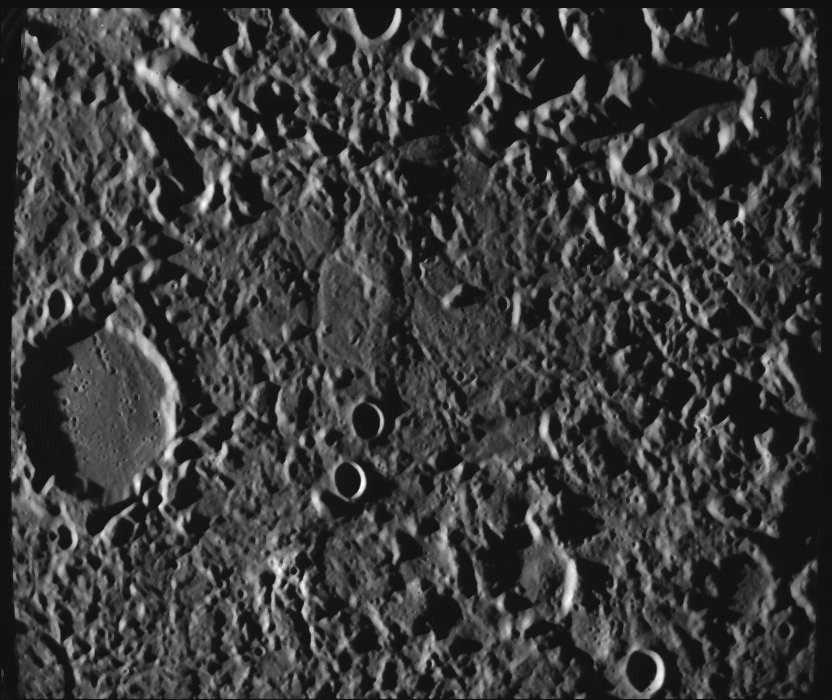
The chaotic terrain at the antipode of the Caloris Basin

== On Europa ==
Chaos terrain is plentiful on Europa, covering between 20 and 40% of the surface. While many hypotheses have been proposed, none yet fully explains the origin of this terrain. On Europa, "chaos terrain" includes geological features such as chaos lenticulae, pits, spots, and domes. Chaos terrain has been observed at both a higher and lower altitude than surrounding non-chaos terrain but is most often uplifted from nearby topography.

Nearly all observed chaos terrain lies on top of its surroundings, indicating chaos terrain is a relatively young feature on Europa. Chaos terrain can fall into two categories on Europa: "fresh" and "modified". Fresh chaos terrain is very young and has not been crosscut by other geological features. Modified chaos terrain is older, with smoother edges and crosscutting features.

A possible origin of the lenticulae on Europa's surface is the strong gravitational pull of Jupiter. As the surface is stretched and squished, the surface may crack and pull apart, or be pushed together. Another potential origin of various chaos terrain on Europa is interactions between the icy surface and liquid ocean under Europa's surface. Warm water plumes can melt the surface of Europa, and then movements of the shell can move chaos terrain to a different location than where it was formed.

== On Pluto ==
Chaos terrain on Pluto is not as well understood as that on other bodies. On Pluto, chaos terrain is referred to most often as "Montes" and are likely made up mostly of water ice, which at the temperature of Pluto's surface acts as bedrock. Additionally, at Pluto's temperature, nitrogen ice is not able to form the tall topographical features we observe around the Sputnik basin, further proving water ice as the main component of the montes formations. Most of the montes on Pluto are on the outside edges of Sputnik Planitia, a giant impact basin. The cause of this is the uplift and disruption due to the high-energy impact.

== Causes ==
The specific causes of chaos terrain are not yet well understood. A number of different astrogeological forces have been offered as causes of chaos terrain. On Europa, impact events and subsequent penetration into a ductile or liquid crust were suggested in 2004. In November 2011, a team of researchers from the University of Texas at Austin and elsewhere presented evidence in the journal Nature suggesting that many "chaos terrain" features on Europa sit atop vast lakes of liquid water. These lakes would be entirely encased in the moon's icy outer shell and distinct from a liquid ocean thought to exist farther down beneath the ice shell. Rather than an external impact, the authors propose a four-step model for producing the surface expressions (chaos terrain) and the shallow, covered lakes. Full confirmation of the lakes' existence will require a space mission designed to probe the ice shell either physically or indirectly, for example using radar.

On Mars, chaos terrain is believed to be associated with the release of huge amounts of water. The chaotic features may have collapsed when water came out of the surface. Martian rivers begin with a chaos region. In 2018, radar studies from the Mars Express mission detected evidence of subglacial lakes beneath Mars' south polar region, supporting the idea that underground water may contribute to the formation of chaos terrain.

A chaotic region can be recognized by a rat's nest of mesas, buttes, and hills, chopped through with valleys which in places look almost patterned. Some parts of this chaotic area have not collapsed completely—they are still formed into large mesas, so they may still contain water ice. Chaotic terrain occurs in numerous locations on Mars, and always gives the strong impression that something abruptly disturbed the ground. Chaos regions formed long ago. By counting craters (more craters in any given area means an older surface) and by studying the valleys' relations with other geological features, scientists have concluded the channels formed 2.0 to 3.8 billion years ago.

Scientists have thought of different ideas for the cause of chaotic terrain. One explanation for the source of the water that quickly left the ground and created chaos is that water rich sediment was deposited in giant canyons on the floor of an ocean. Later, when the ocean disappeared, the sediments froze. If hot magma came near to the region, the ice would have melted and formed large underground river systems. When these neared the surface, huge amounts would break out of the ground and carve the valleys we see today. There is much evidence for an ocean on Mars. Places have been photographed that could be where the ground collapsed when water left subterranean rivers to flow out of chaotic regions. One of the first hypotheses for the source of the water was based on old Viking Orbiter pictures. It was thought that these outflows came from a global cryosphere-confined aquifer that collected water from south polar meltwater. The cryosphere would have formed during the Hesperian period in the planet's history into the planet's upper crust. One chaotic terrain, Galaxias Chaos may be caused by sublimation of an ice-rich deposit.

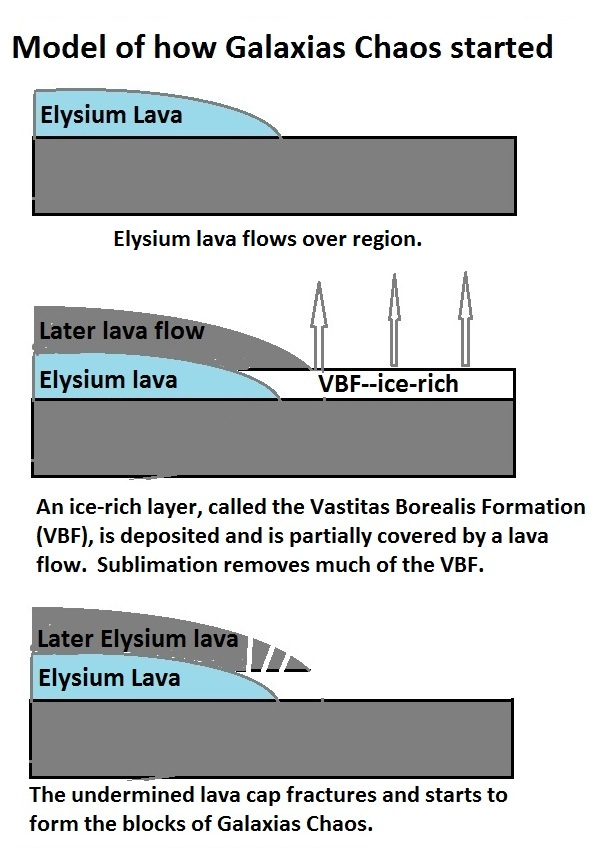
This series of drawings show another model for the formation of Martian chaos, as proposed by Pedersen and Head, 2011. Amount of sublimation is exaggerated to improve understanding. Click on image to see more details.

== See also ==
- Arachnoids – Large structure of unknown origin on Venus
- List of areas of chaos terrain on Mars
- Planetary geology – Geological study of planets
- Margaritifer Sinus quadrangle – One of a series of 30 quadrangle maps of Mars
- Geysers on Mars – Putative CO2 gas and dust eruptions on Mars
- Martian chaos terrain – Irregular groups of large blocks of rock
- Rille – Fissure, especially on the Moon
