= Miyamoto (crater) =

- Planet: Mars
- Coordinates: 2.88°S 7.0°W
- Quadrangle: Margaritifer Sinus
- Diameter: 160.0 km
- Eponym: Shotaro Miyamoto

Miyamoto is a crater within the Margaritifer Sinus quadrangle (MC-19) region of the planet Mars, west of the Plains of Meridiani. It is 150 kilometers (93 mi) wide. Its northeastern half is filled with rocks formed in the presence of water and include minerals of iron and sulfur, which likely settled on lake bottoms or in groundwater systems. In the southwestern half of the crater floor, erosion has stripped these materials away, revealing clays and other materials like those found in the most ancient Martian rocks. More than 3.5 billion years old, they date to the Noachian era at which time, liquid water was likely present at the surface and could have created an environment favorable to life. Miyamoto was considered as a possible landing site for the Mars Science Laboratory.

== Mars Science Laboratory ==
Several sites in the Margaritifer Sinus quadrangle have been proposed as areas to send NASA's next major Mars rover, the Mars Science Laboratory. Miyamoto Crater was in the top seven sites chosen. Among the top 33 landing sites was Iani Chaos. Holden Crater is believed to have once been a lake. Eberswalde Crater contains a delta. There is a great deal of evidence that Miyamoto Crater once contained rivers and lakes. Many minerals, such as clays, chlorides, sulfates, and iron oxides, have been discovered there. Miyamoto Crater displays Inverted relief in the form of inverted channels. The picture below shows an inverted channel in Miyamoto. Inverted channels formed from accumulated sediments that were cemented by minerals. These channels eroded into the surface, then the whole area was covered over with sediments. When the sediments were later eroded away, the place where the river channel existed remained because the hardened material were resistant to erosion.

In an article published in January 2010, a large group of scientists endorsed the idea of searching for life in Miyamoto Crater because of inverted stream channels and minerals that indicated the past presence of water. The aim of the Mars Science Laboratory is to search for signs of ancient life. It is hoped that a later mission could then return samples from sites identified as probably containing remains of life. To safely bring the craft down, a 12 mile wide, smooth, flat circle is needed. Geologists hope to examine places where water once ponded. They would like to examine sediment layers. The seven finalists were: Eberswalde crater, Gale crater, Holden crater, Mawrth Vallis, Miyamoto Crater, Nili Fossae Trough, Southern Meridiani (also near Miyamato)

== Gallery ==
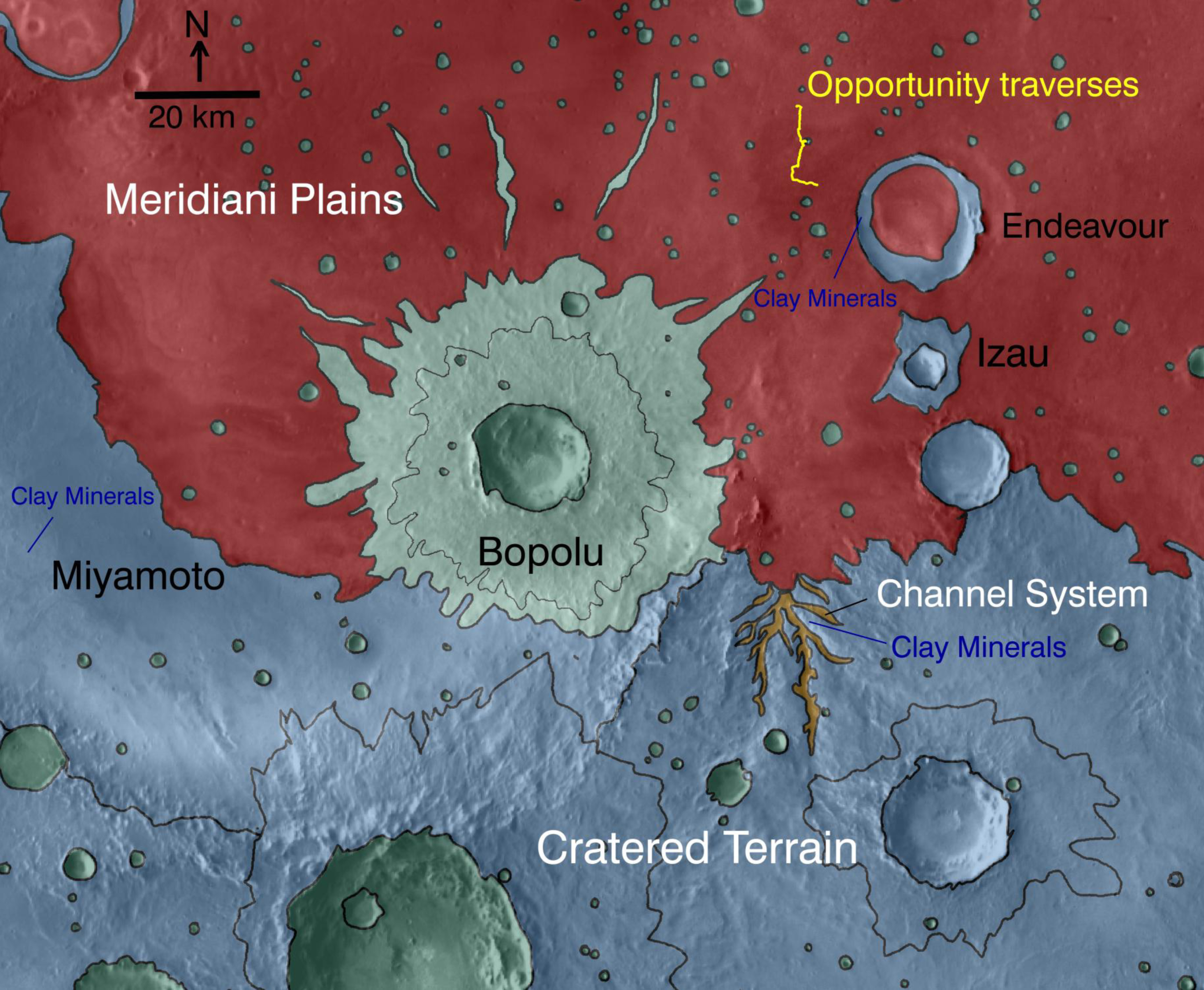
Color-coded for minerals and annotated

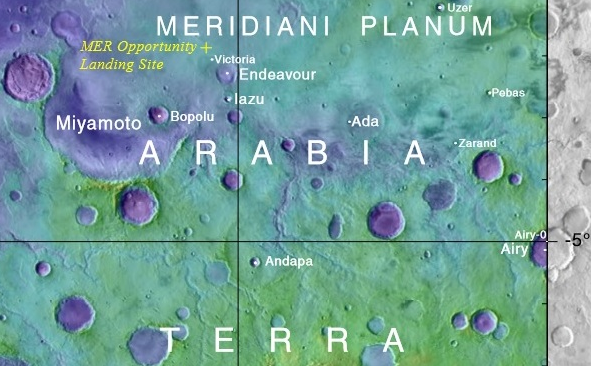
Annotated elevation map of Opportunity landing site and some surrounding craters including Endeavour and Miyamato

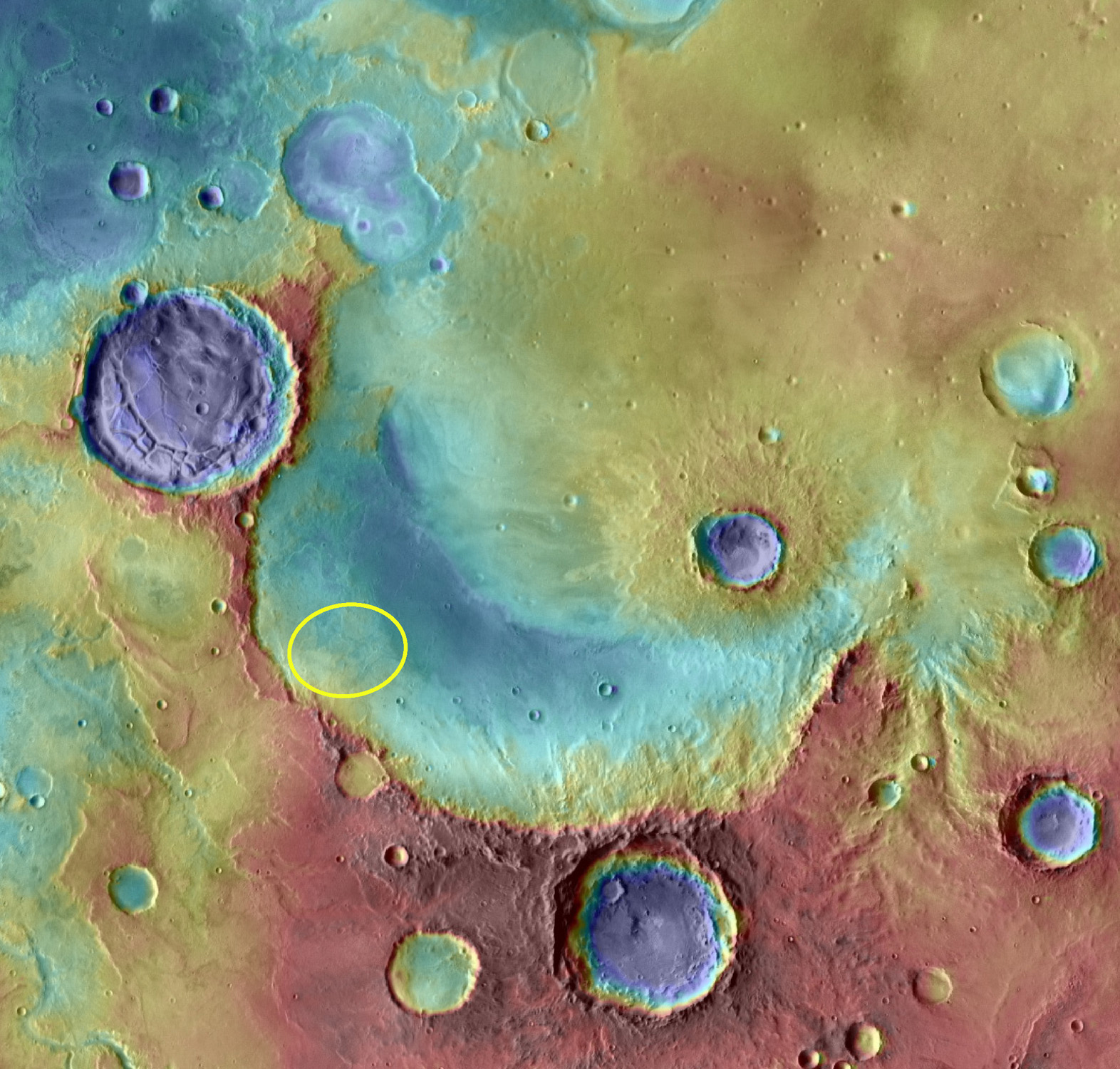
The proposed landing ellipse in Miyamoto when it was one of seven finalists under consideration as a landing site for MSL. Gale was eventually chosen.

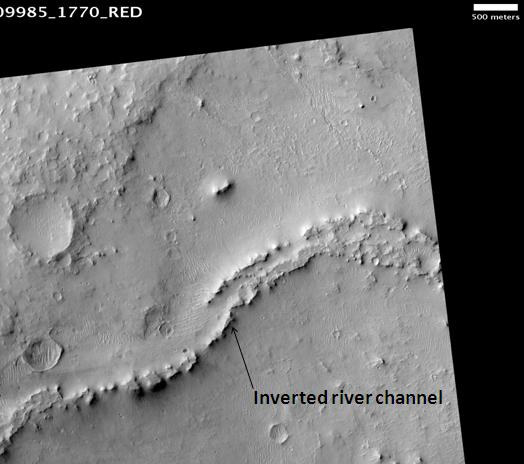
Inverted Channel in Miyamoto Crater, as seen by HiRISE

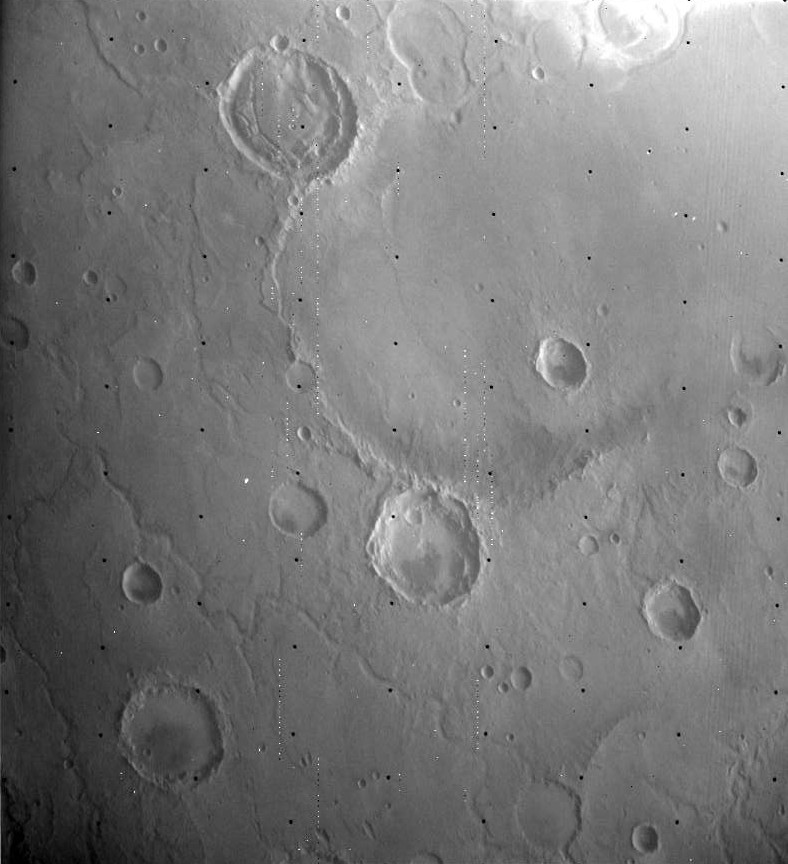
Viking Orbiter 1 image

== See also ==
- Groundwater on Mars
- Nearby craters:
  - Endeavour (crater)
  - Bopolu (crater)
  - Iazu (crater)
- Nearby spacecraft
  - Opportunity (rover)
  - ExoMars Schiaparelli EDM lander
