= Margaritifer Sinus quadrangle =

One of a series of 30 quadrangle maps of Mars

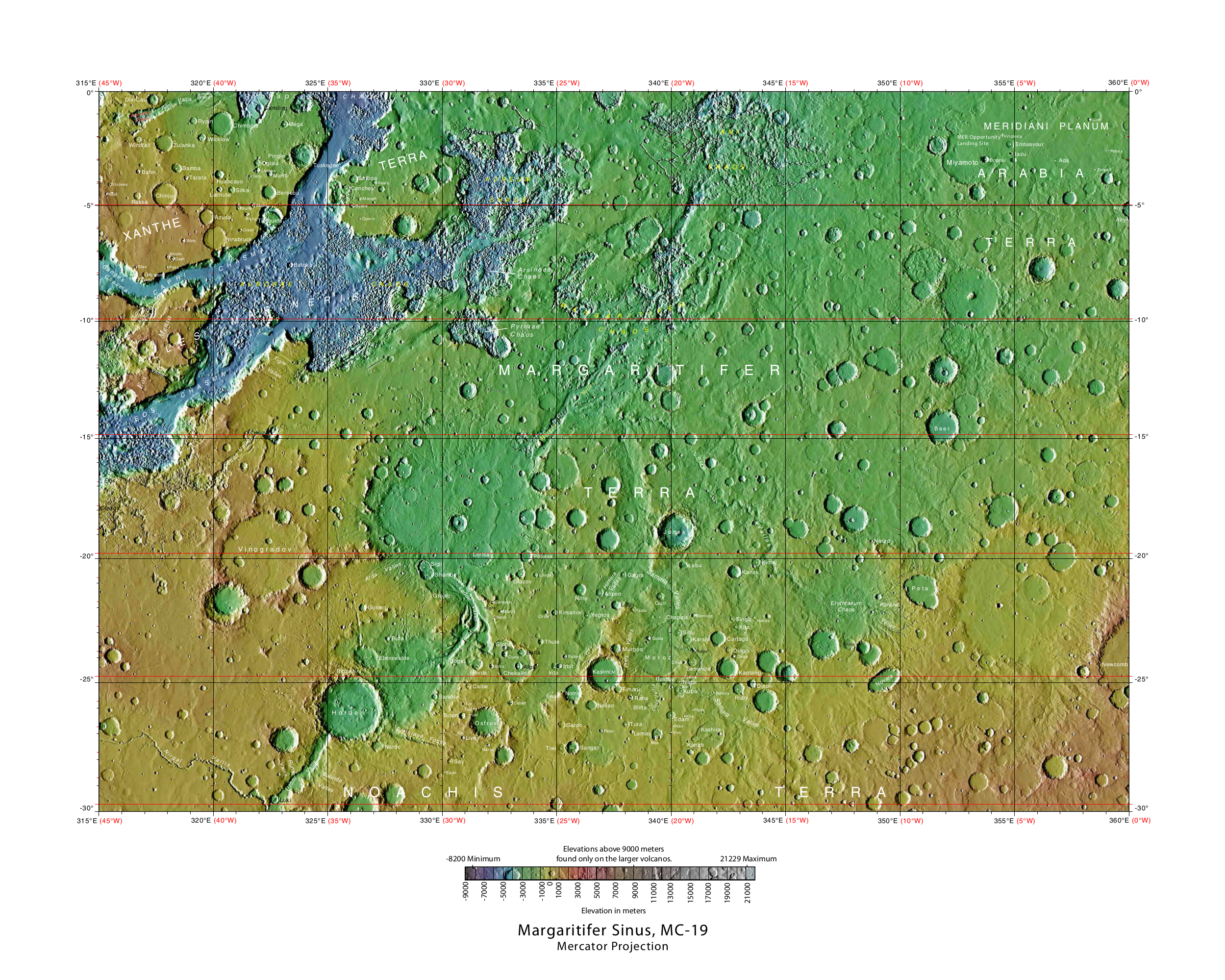
- Map of Margartifer Sinus quadrangle from Mars Orbiter Laser Altimeter (MOLA) data. The highest elevations are red and the lowest are blue.
- Coordinates: 15°S 22.5°W

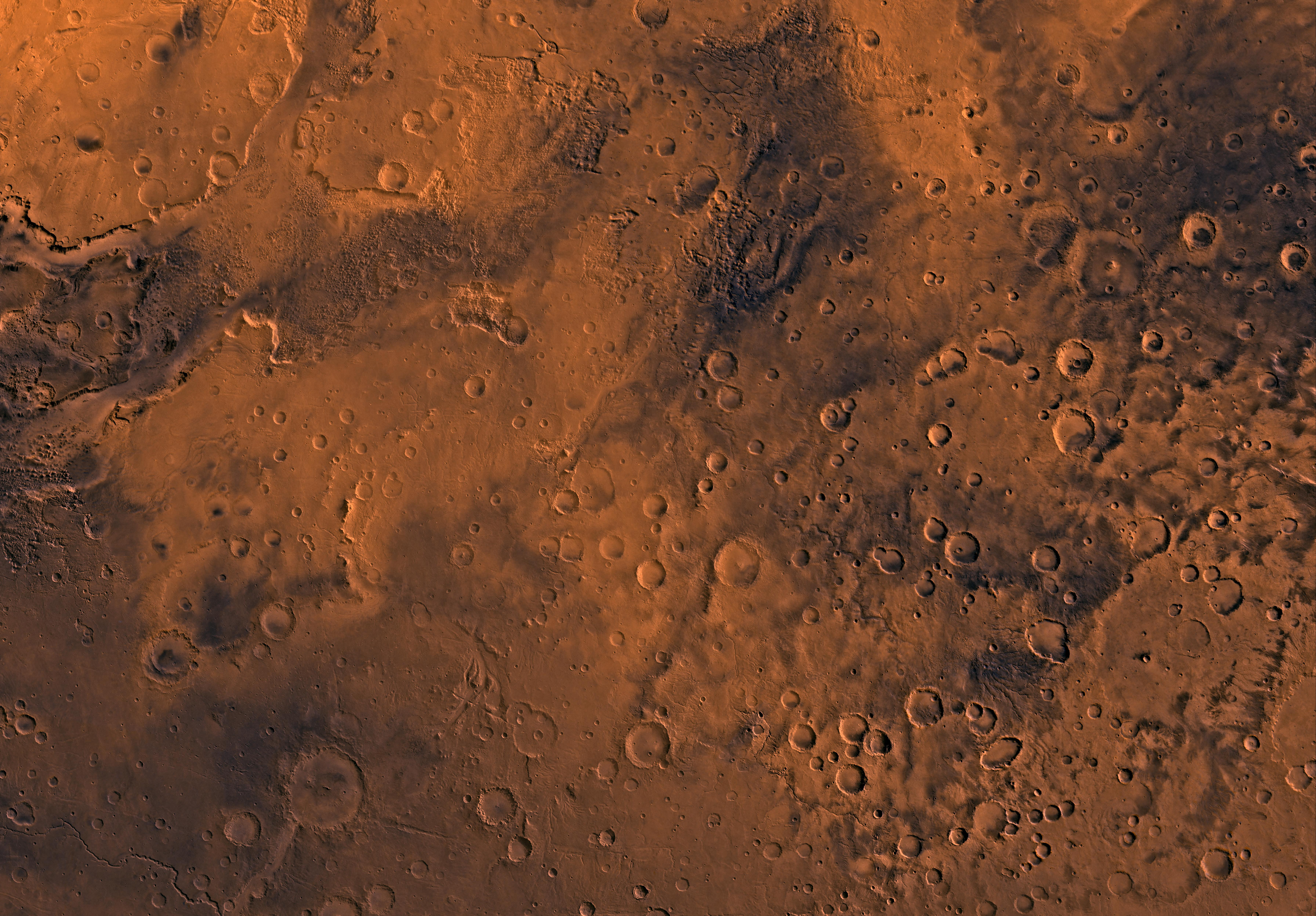
Image of the Margaritifer Sinus Quadrangle (MC-19). Most of the region contains heavily cratered highlands, marked with large expanses of chaotic terrain. In the northwestern part, the major rift zone of Valles Marineris connects with a broad canyon filled with chaotic terrain.

The Margaritifer Sinus quadrangle is one of a series of 30 quadrangle maps of Mars used by the United States Geological Survey (USGS) Astrogeology Research Program. The Margaritifer Sinus quadrangle is also referred to as MC-19 (Mars Chart-19). The Margaritifer Sinus quadrangle covers the area from 0° to 45° west longitude and 0° to 30° south latitude on Mars. Margaritifer Sinus quadrangle contains Margaritifer Terra and parts of Xanthe Terra, Noachis Terra, Arabia Terra, and Meridiani Planum.

The name of this quadrangle means "pearl bay" after the pearl coast at Cape Comorin in South India.

This quadrangle shows many signs of past water with evidence of lakes, deltas, ancient rivers, inverted channels, and chaos regions that released water. Margaritifer Sinus contains some of the longest lake-chain systems on Mars, perhaps because of a wetter climate, more groundwater, or some of each factor. The Samara/Himera lake-chain system is about 1800 km long; the Parara/Loire valley network and lake-chain system is about 1100 km long. A low area between Parana Valles and Loire Vallis is believed to have once held a lake. The 154 km diameter Holden Crater also once held a lake. Near Holden Crater is a graben, called Erythraea Fossa, that once held a chain of three lakes.

This region contains abundant clay-bearing sediments of Noachian age. Spectral studies with CRISM showed Fe/Mg-phyllosilicates, a type of clay. Biological materials can be preserved in clay. It is believed that this clay was formed in near-neutral pH water. The clay was not mixed with sulfates which form under acid conditions. Life is probably more likely to form under neutral pH conditions.

This region of Mars is famous because the Opportunity Rover landed there on January 25, 2004, at 1.94°S and 354.47°E (5.53° W). NASA declared the mission over in a press conference on February 13, 2019. This mission lasted almost 15 years. Russia's Mars 6 crash-landed in Margaritifer Sinus quadrangle at 23.9 S and 19.42 W.

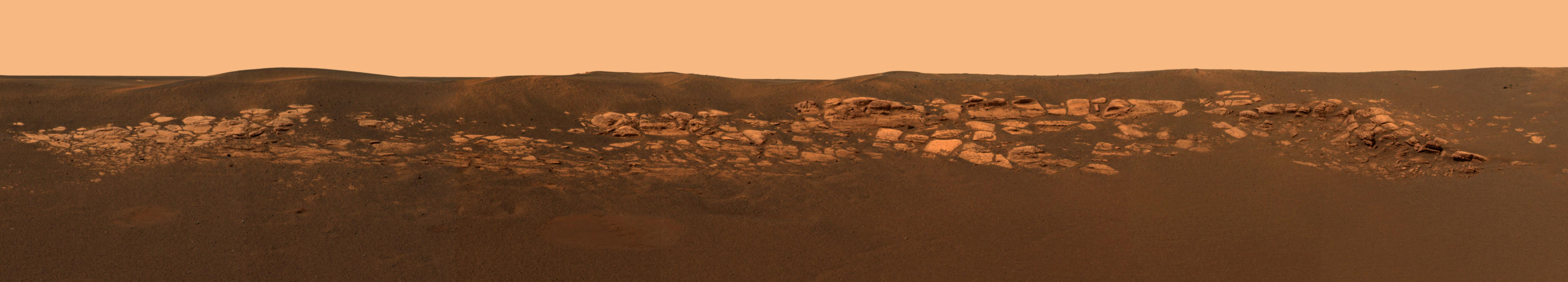
This panorama of Eagle crater shows outcroppings which are thought to have water origins.

== Rock and mineral discoveries at Meridiani Planum ==
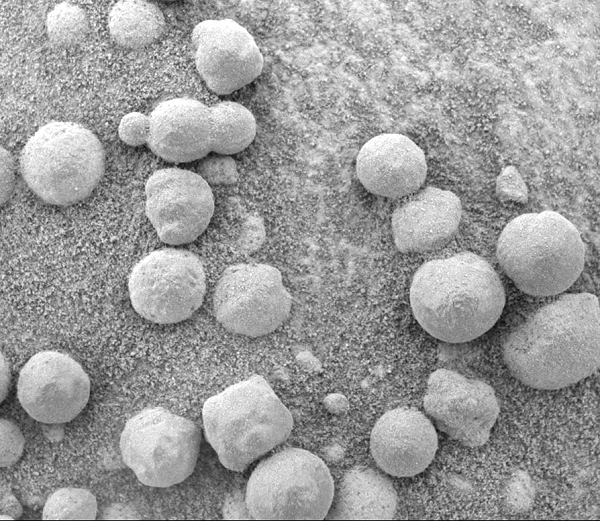
"Blueberries" (hematite spheres) on a rocky outcrop at Eagle Crater. Note the merged triplet in the upper left.

Opportunity Rover found that the soil at Meridiani Planum was very similar to the soil at Gusev crater and Ares Vallis; however in many places at Meridiani the soil was covered with round, hard, gray spherules that were named "blueberries". These blueberries were found to be composed almost entirely of the mineral hematite. It was decided that the spectra signal spotted from orbit by Mars Odyssey was produced by these spherules. After further study it was decided that the blueberries were concretions formed in the ground by water. Over time, these concretions weathered from what was overlying rock, and then became concentrated on the surface as a lag deposit. The concentration of spherules in bedrock could have produced the observed blueberry covering from the weathering of as little as one meter of rock. Most of the soil consisted of olivine basalt sands that did not come from the local rocks. The sand may have been transported from somewhere else.

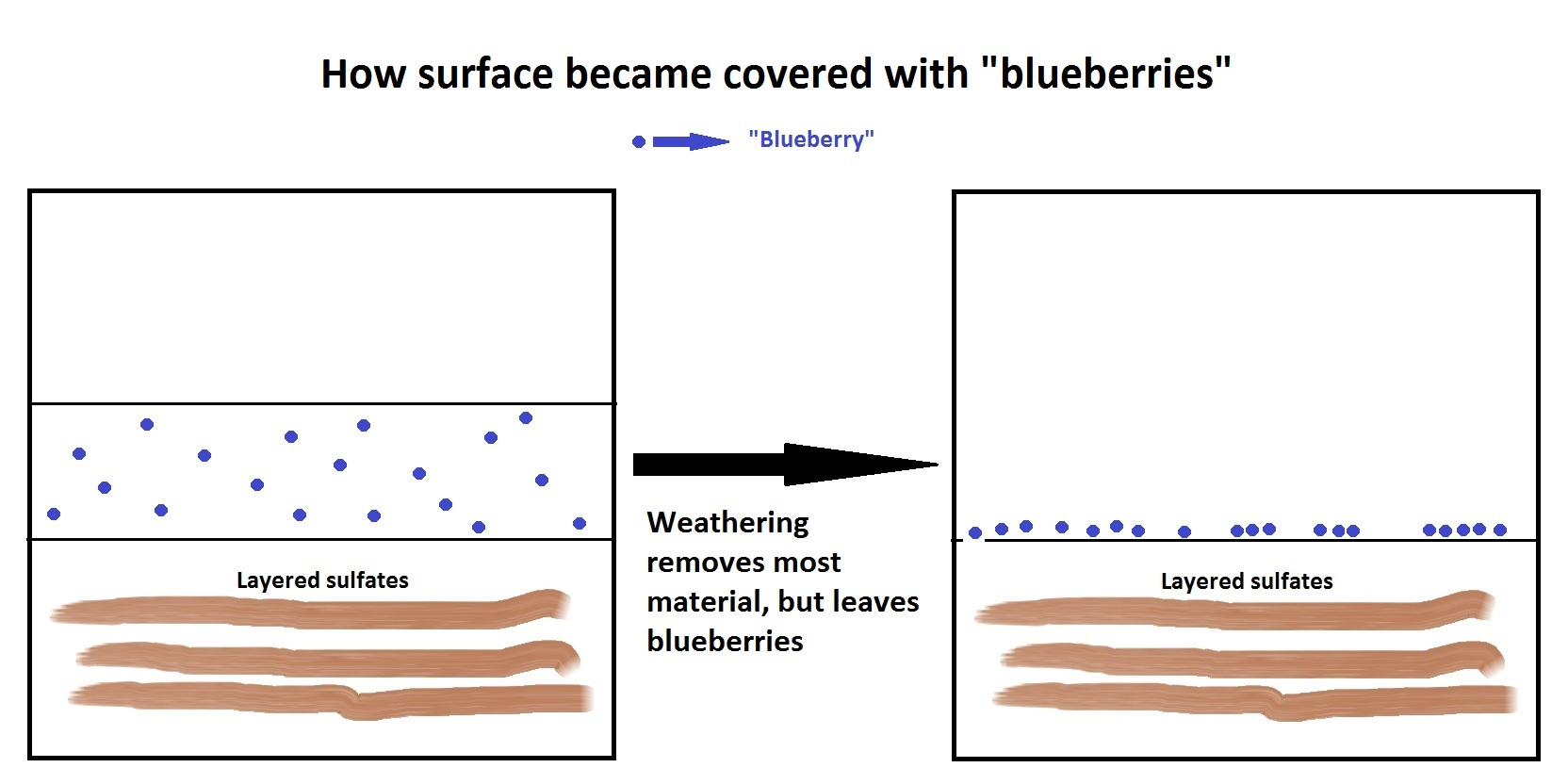
Drawing showing how "blueberries" came to cover much of surface in Meridiani Planum

=== Minerals in dust ===
A Mössbauer spectrum was made of the dust that gathered on Opportunity's capture magnet. The results suggested that the magnetic component of the dust was titanomagnetite, rather than just plain magnetite, as was once thought. A small amount of olivine was also detected which was interpreted as indicating a long arid period on the planet. On the other hand, a small amount of hematite that was present meant that there may have been liquid water for a short time in the early history of the planet. Because the Rock Abrasion Tool (RAT) found it easy to grind into the bedrocks, it is thought that the rocks are much softer than the rocks at Gusev crater.

=== Bedrock minerals ===
Few rocks were visible on the surface where Opportunity landed, but bedrock that was exposed in craters was examined by the suit of instruments on the Rover. Bedrock rocks were found to be sedimentary rocks with a high concentration of sulfur in the form of calcium and magnesium sulfates. Some of the sulfates that may be present in bedrocks are kieserite, sulfate anhydrate, bassanite, hexahydrite, epsomite, and gypsum. Salts, such as halite, bischofite, antarcticite, bloedite, vanthoffite, or glauberite, may also be present.

The rocks containing the sulfates had a light tone compared to isolated rocks and rocks examined by landers/rovers at other locations on Mars. The spectra of these light toned rocks, containing hydrated sulfates, were similar to spectra taken by the Thermal Emission Spectrometer on board the Mars Global Surveyor. The same spectrum is found over a large area, so it is believed that water once appeared over a wide region, not just in the area explored by Opportunity Rover.

The Alpha Particle X-ray Spectrometer (APXS) found rather high levels of phosphorus in the rocks. Similar high levels were found by other rovers at Ares Vallis and Gusev Crater, so it has been hypothesized that the mantle of Mars may be phosphorus-rich. The minerals in the rocks could have originated by acid weathering of basalt. Because the solubility of phosphorus is related to the solubility of uranium, thorium, and rare earth elements, they are all also expected to be enriched in rocks.

When Opportunity Rover traveled to the rim of Endeavour crater, it soon found a white vein that was later identified as being pure gypsum. It was formed when water carrying gypsum in solution deposited the mineral in a crack in the rock. A picture of this vein, called "Homestake" formation, is shown below.

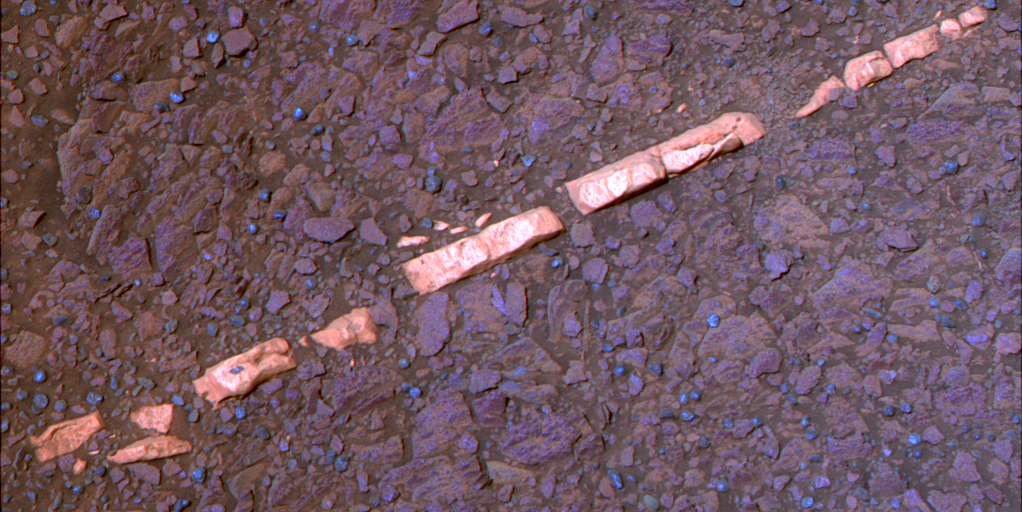
"Homestake" formation

=== Evidence for water ===
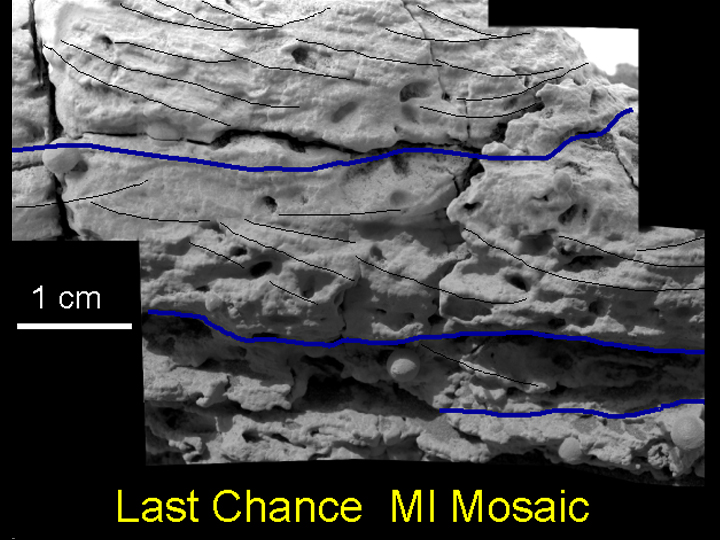
Cross-bedding features in rock "Last Chance"

Examination of Meridiani rocks found strong evidence for past water. The mineral called jarosite which only forms in water was found in all bedrocks. This discovery proved that water once existed in Meridiani Planum In addition, some rocks showed small laminations (layers) with shapes that are only made by gently flowing water. The first such laminations were found in a rock called "The Dells". Geologists would say that the cross-stratification showed festoon geometry from transport in subaqueous ripples. A picture of cross-stratification, also called cross-bedding, is shown on the left.

Box-shaped holes in some rocks were caused by sulfates forming large crystals, and then when the crystals later dissolved, holes, called vugs, were left behind. The concentration of the element bromine in rocks was highly variable probably because it is very soluble. Water may have concentrated it in places before it evaporated. Another mechanism for concentrating highly soluble bromine compounds is frost deposition at night that would form very thin films of water that would concentrate bromine in certain spots.

=== Rock from impact ===
One rock, "Bounce Rock", found sitting on the sandy plains was found to be ejecta from an impact crater. Its chemistry was different from the bedrocks. Containing mostly pyroxene and plagioclase and no olivine, it closely resembled a part, Lithology B, of the shergottite meteorite EETA 79001, a meteorite known to have come from Mars. Bounce rock received its name by being near an airbag bounce mark.

=== Meteorites ===
Opportunity Rover found meteorites just sitting on the plains. The first one analyzed with Opportunity's instruments was called "Heatshield Rock", as it was found near where Opportunity's headshield landed. Examination with the Miniature Thermal Emission Spectrometer (Mini-TES), Mossbauer spectrometer, and APXS lead researchers to, classify it as an IAB meteorite. The APXS determined it was composed of 93% iron and 7% nickel. The cobble named "Fig Tree Barberton" is thought to be a stony or stony-iron meteorite (mesosiderite silicate), while "Allan Hills", and "Zhong Shan" may be iron meteorites.

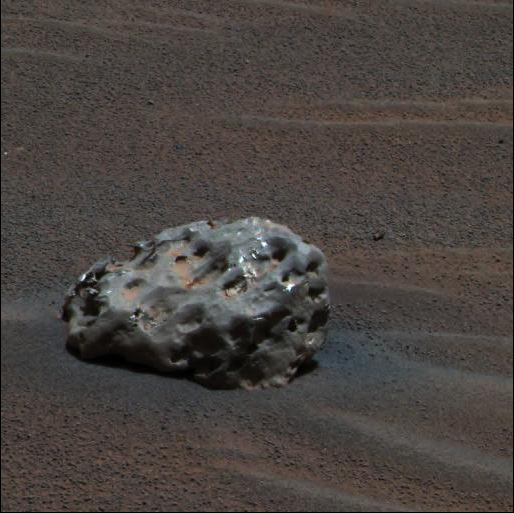
Heat Shield Rock was the first meteorite ever identified on another planet.

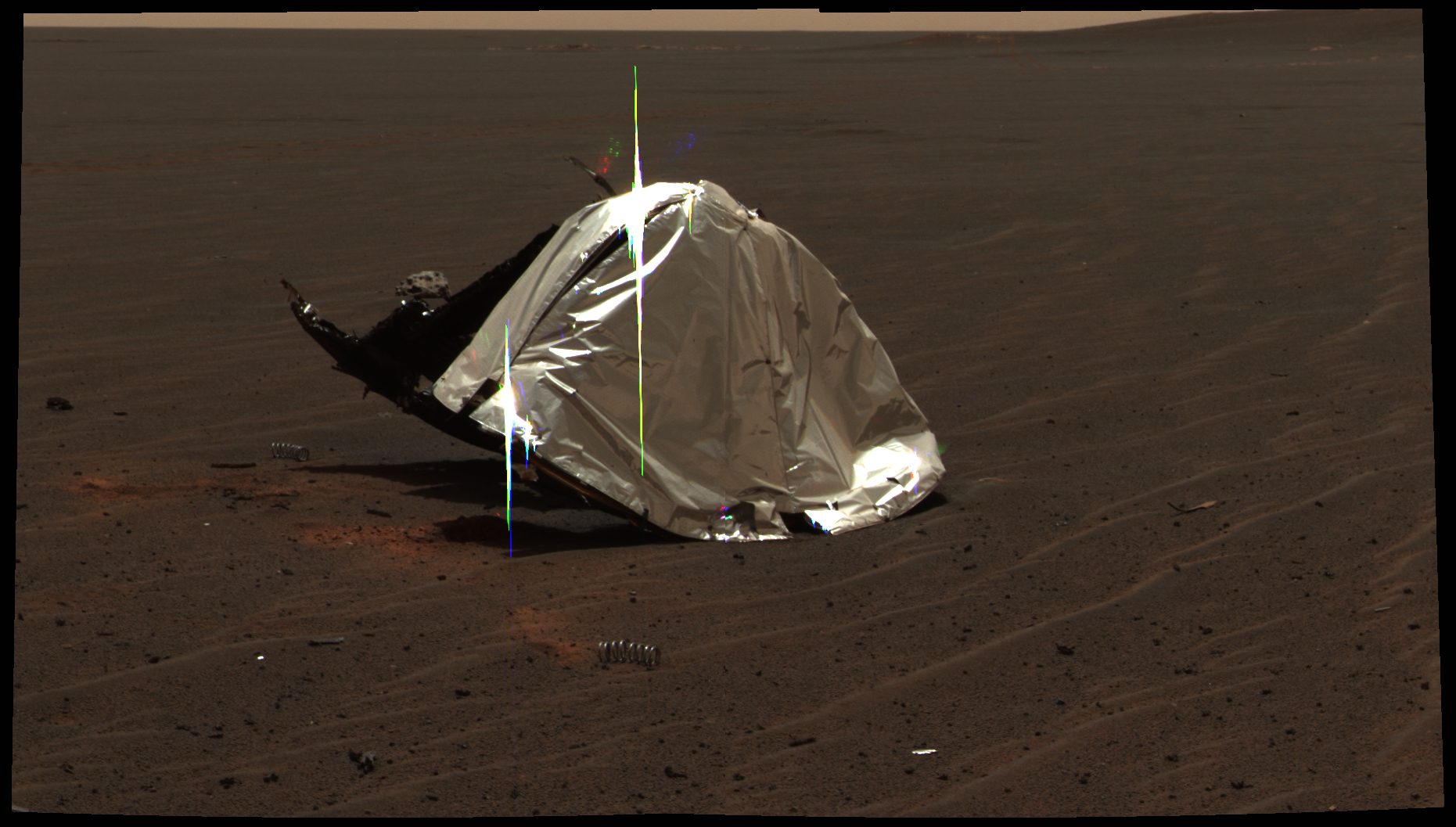
Heat shield, with Heat Shield Rock just above and to the left in the background

=== Geological history ===
Observations at the site have led scientists to believe that the area was flooded with water a number of times and was subjected to evaporation and desiccation. In the process sulfates were deposited. After sulfates cemented the sediments, hematite concretions grew by precipitation from groundwater. Some sulfates formed into large crystals which later dissolved to leave vugs. Several lines of evidence point toward an arid climate in the past billion years or so, but a climate supporting water, at least for a time, in the distant past.

== Vallis ==
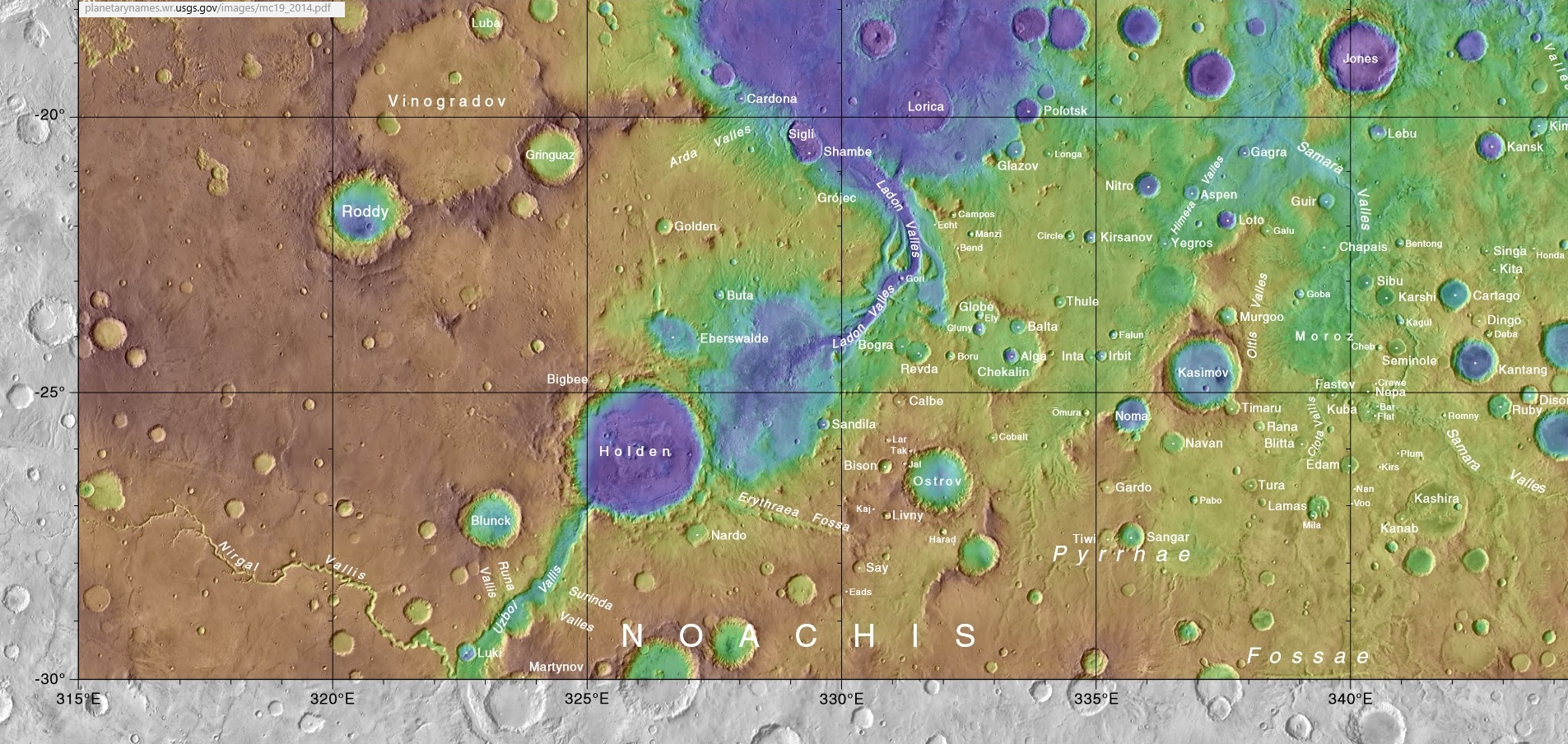
Map showing locations of several valleys in the Margaritifer Sinus quadrangle: Landon Valles, Nirgal Vallis, Uzboi Vallis, Arda Valles, Samara Valles, Himera Valles, and Clota Vallis

Vallis (plural valles) is the Latin word for "valley". It is used in planetary geology for the naming of valley landform features on other planets.

Vallis was used for old river valleys that were discovered on Mars, when probes were first sent to Mars. The Viking Orbiters caused a revolution in our ideas about water on Mars; huge river valleys were found in many areas. Space craft cameras showed that floods of water broke through dams, carved deep valleys, eroded grooves into bedrock, and traveled thousands of kilometers. Nirgal Vallis is a tributary of Uzboi Vallis. Nirgal Vallis is believed to have formed by groundwater sapping, not by precipitation. Spectral analyses has found phyllosilicates (clays) that are iron-magnesium smectites. Some researchers believe these were formed by interaction with groundwater. Over a wide area, Al-smectites are found on top of Fe/Mg smectites.

== Branched streams seen by Viking ==
The Viking orbiters discovered much about water on Mars. Branched streams, studied by the orbiters in the southern hemisphere, suggested that rain once fell.

== Aureum Chaos ==
Aureum Chaos is a major canyon system and collapsed area. It is probably a major source of water for large outflow channels.

Large outflow channels on Mars are believed to be caused by catastrophic discharges of ground water. Many of the channels begin in chaotic terrain, where the ground has apparently collapsed. In the collapsed section, blocks of undisturbed material be seen. The OMEGA experiment on Mars Express discovered clay minerals (phyllosilicates) in a variety of places in Aureum Chaos. Clay minerals need water to form, so the area may once have contained large amounts of water. Scientists are interested in determining what parts of Mars contained water because evidence of past or present life may be found there.

On April 1, 2010, NASA released the first images under the HiWish program, with the public suggesting places for HiRISE to photograph. One of the eight locations was Aureum Chaos.

== Layers ==
Many places on Mars show rocks arranged in layers. Rock can form layers in a variety of ways. Volcanoes, wind, or water can produce layers. A detailed discussion of layering with many Martian examples can be found in Sedimentary Geology of Mars. Sometimes the layers are of different colors. Light-toned rocks on Mars have been associated with hydrated minerals like sulfates. The Mars rover Opportunity examined such layers close up with several instruments. Some layers are probably made up of fine particles because they seem to break up into find dust. Other layers break up into large boulders so they are probably much harder. Basalt, a volcanic rock, is thought to in the layers that form boulders. Basalt has been identified on Mars in many places. Instruments on orbiting spacecraft have detected clay (also called phyllosilicate) in some layers.

A detailed discussion of layering with many Martian examples can be found in Sedimentary Geology of Mars.

Layers can be hardened by the action of groundwater. Martian ground water probably moved hundreds of kilometers, and in the process it dissolved many minerals from the rock it passed through. When ground water surfaces in low areas containing sediments, water evaporates in the thin atmosphere and leaves behind minerals as deposits and/or cementing agents. Consequently, layers of dust could not later easily erode away since they were cemented together.

,

== Mars Science Laboratory ==
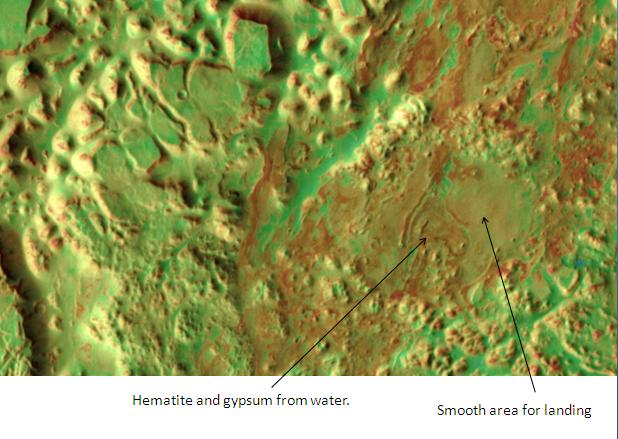
Landing zone in Iani Chaos, as seen by THEMIS

Several sites in the Margaritifer Sinus quadrangle have been proposed as areas to send NASA's next major Mars rover, the Mars Science Laboratory. Both Holden crater and Eberswalde crater made the cut to be among the top four. Miyamoto Crater was in the top seven sites chosen. Holden crater is believed to have once been a lake. Actually, it is now believed that it held two lakes. The first was longer lived and was formed from drainage within the crater and precipitation. The last lake began when water dammed up in Uzboi Vallis broke through a divide, then rapidly drained into Holden crater. Because there are rocks meters in diameter on the crater floor, it is thought it was a powerful flood when water flowed into the crater.

Eberswalde Crater contains a delta. There is a great deal of evidence that Miyamoto crater once contained rivers and lakes. Many minerals, such as clays, chlorides, sulfates, and iron oxides, have been discovered there. These minerals are often formed in water. A picture below shows an inverted channel in Miyamoto crater. Inverted channels formed from accumulated sediments that were cemented by minerals. These channels eroded into the surface, then the whole area was covered over with sediments. When the sediments were later eroded away, the place where the river channel existed remained because the hardened material that was deposited in the channel was resistant to erosion. Iani Chaos, pictured below, was among the top 33 landing sites. Deposits of hematite and gypsum have been found there. Those minerals are usually formed in connection with water.

The aim of the Mars Science Laboratory is to search for signs of ancient life. It is hoped that a later mission could then return samples from sites that the Mars Science Laboratory identified as probably containing remains of life. To safely bring the craft down, a 12-mile-wide, smooth, flat circle is needed. Geologists hope to examine places where water once ponded. They would like to examine sediment layers. In the end, it was decided to send the Mars science Laboratory, called "Curiosity", to Gale crater in the Aeolis quadrangle.

== Inverted relief ==
Some places on Mars show inverted relief. In these locations, a stream bed may be a raised feature, instead of a valley. The inverted former stream channels may be caused by the deposition of large rocks or due to cementation. In either case erosion would erode the surrounding land and leave the old channel as a raised ridge because the ridge will be more resistant to erosion. An image below, taken with HiRISE of Miyamoto crater shows a ridge that is an old channel that has become inverted.

== Deltas ==
Researchers have found a number of examples of deltas that formed in Martian lakes. Finding deltas is a major sign that Mars once had a lot of water. Deltas often require deep water over a long period of time to form. Also, the water level needs to be stable to keep sediment from washing away. Deltas have been found over a wide geographical range.

== Craters ==
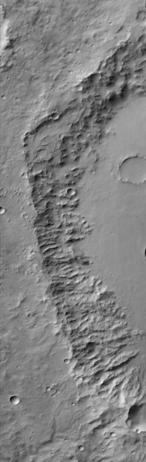
Beer Crater eroded west wall, as seen by CTX

Impact craters generally have a rim with ejecta around them, in contrast volcanic craters usually do not have a rim or ejecta deposits. As craters get larger (greater than 10 km in diameter) they usually have a central peak. The peak is caused by a rebound of the crater floor following the impact. Sometimes craters will display layers. Craters can show us what lies deep under the surface.

In December 2011, Opportunity Rover discovered a vein of gypsum sticking out of the soil along the rim of Endeavour crater. Tests confirmed that it contained calcium, sulfur, and water. The mineral gypsum is the best match for the data. It likely formed from mineral rich water moving through a crack in the rock. The vein, called "Homestake", is in Mars' Meridiani plain. It could have been produced in conditions more neutral than the harshly acidic conditions indicated by the other sulfate deposits; hence this environment may have been more hospitable for a large variety of living organisms. Homestake is in a zone where the sulfate-rich sedimentary bedrock of the plains meets older, volcanic bedrock exposed at the rim of Endeavour crater.

== Unnamed channels ==
There is enormous evidence that water once flowed in river valleys on Mars. Images of curved channels have been seen in images from Mars spacecraft dating back to the early 1970s with the Mariner 9 orbiter. Indeed, a study published in June 2017, calculated that the volume of water needed to carve all the channels on Mars was even larger than the proposed ocean that the planet may have had. Water was probably recycled many times from the ocean to rainfall around Mars.

== See also ==
- Composition of Mars – Branch of the geology of Mars
- Geology of Mars – Scientific study of the surface, crust, and interior of the planet Mars
- Groundwater on Mars – Water held in permeable ground
- HiRISE – Camera on board the Mars Reconnaissance Orbiter
- Impact crater – Circular depression in a solid astronomical body formed by the impact of a smaller object
- Lakes on Mars – Former bodies of water on Mars
- List of areas of chaos terrain on Mars
- Chaos terrain – Distinctive area of broken or jumbled terrain
- Geology of Mars – Scientific study of the surface, crust, and interior of the planet Mars
- Galaxias Chaos – Chaos on Mars
- Martian chaos terrain – Irregular groups of large blocks of rock
- Martian Craters
- Martian soil – Fine regolith found on the surface of Mars
- Opportunity rover – NASA Mars rover deployed in 2004
- Outflow channels – Long, wide swathes of scoured ground on Mars
- Scientific information from the Mars Exploration Rover mission
- Spirit rover – Former NASA Mars rover, active from 2004 to 2010
- Uzboi-Landon-Morava (ULM) – Series of channels and depressions that may have carried water across a major part of Mars
- Vallis – Valley landform on other planets (mostly Mars)
- Water on Mars – Study of past and present water on Mars

MC-01 Mare Boreum (features)
MC-02 Diacria (features)		MC-03 Arcadia (features)	MC-04 Acidalium (features)	MC-05 Ismenius Lacus (features)		MC-06 Casius (features)	MC-07 Cebrenia (features)
MC-08 Amazonis (features)	MC-09 Tharsis (features)	MC-10 Lunae Palus (features)	MC-11 Oxia Palus (features)	MC-12 Arabia (features)	MC-13 Syrtis Major (features)	MC-14 Amenthes (features)	MC-15 Elysium (features)
MC-16 Memnonia (features)	MC-17 Phoenicis Lacus (features)	MC-18 Coprates (features)	MC-19 Margaritifer Sinus (features)	MC-20 Sinus Sabaeus (features)	MC-21 Iapygia (features)	MC-22 Mare Tyrrhenum (features)	MC-23 Aeolis (features)
MC-24 Phaethontis (features)		MC-25 Thaumasia (features)	MC-26 Argyre (features)	MC-27 Noachis (features)		MC-28 Hellas (features)	MC-29 Eridania (features)
MC-30 Mare Australe (features)
