= Paraná Valles =

Valles on Mars

- CTX context image for next image that was taken with HiRISE. Note long ridge going across image is probably an old stream. Box indicates area for HiRISE image.
- Coordinates: 23.1°S 10.2°W

The Paraná Valles are a set of channels in a valley in the Margaritifer Sinus quadrangle (MC-19) region of Mars, located at approximately 23.1° South and 10.2° West. They are 350 kilometres (220 mi) long and were named after an ancient and modern name for a South American river (Brazil, Argentina). A low area between the Paraná Valles and Loire Valles is believed to have once held a lake.

Example of inverted terrain in the Paraná Valles region, as seen by HiRISE under the HiWish program

The Paraná Valles, as seen by HiRISE (scale bar is 1.0 km)

== See also ==
- Geology of Mars
- HiRISE
- HiWish program
- Lakes on Mars
- Vallis (planetary geology)
- Water on Mars
