= Eberswalde (crater) =

Crater on Mars

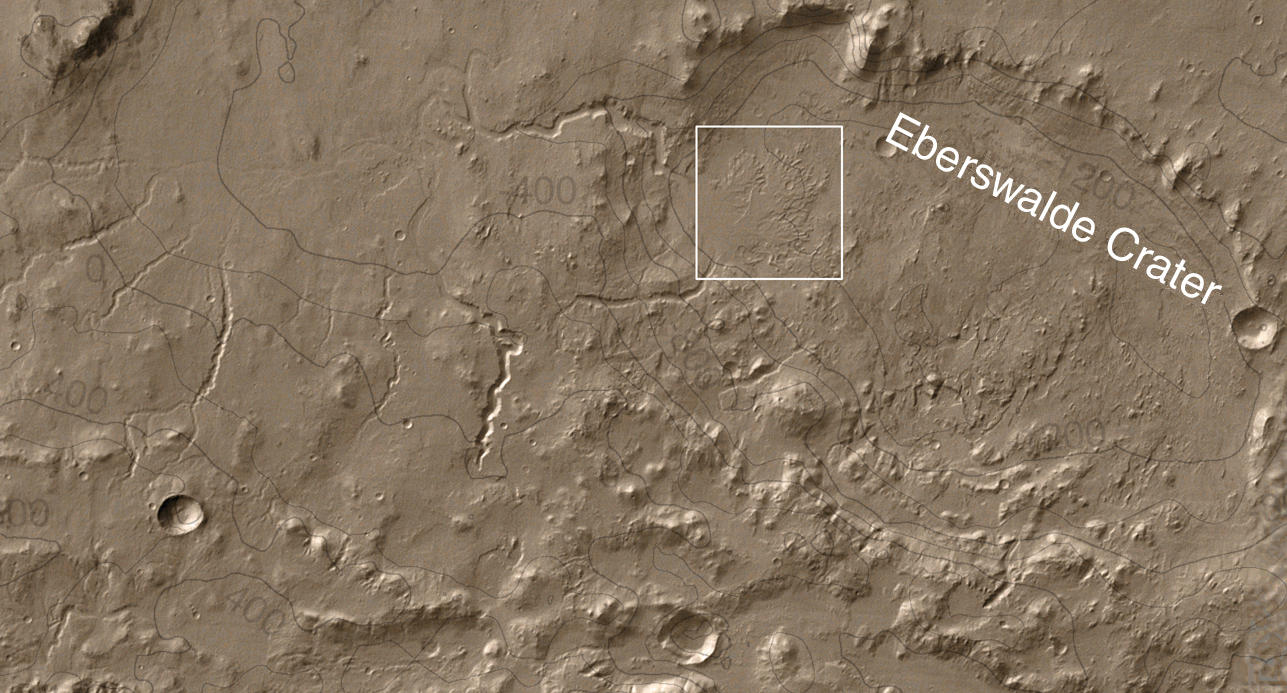
- Planet: Mars
- Region: Margaritifer Terra
- Coordinates: 24°S 33°W
- Quadrangle: Margaritifer Sinus
- Diameter: 65.3 km
- Depth: approx 800 m
- Eponym: Eberswalde, Brandenburg, Germany

Eberswalde, previously known as Holden NE, is a partially buried impact crater in Margaritifer Terra, Mars. Eberswalde crater lies just to the north of Holden, a large crater that may have been a lake. The 65.3-km-diameter crater, centered at 24°S, 33°W, is named after the German town of the same name, in accordance with the International Astronomical Union's rules for planetary nomenclature. It was one of the final four proposed landing sites for the Mars rover Mars Science Laboratory mission. This extraterrestrial geological feature lies situated within the Margaritifer Sinus quadrangle (MC-19) region of Mars. Although not chosen, it was considered a potential landing site for the Mars 2020 Perseverance rover, and in the second Mars 2020 Landing Site Workshop it survived the cut and was among the top eight sites still in the running.

Landforms in the crater provide strong evidence of the prior existence of flowing water on Mars.

== Mars Science Laboratory ==
Several sites in the Margaritifer Sinus quadrangle have been proposed as areas to send NASA's major Mars rover, the Mars Science Laboratory (MSL). Eberswalde was shortlisted as one of the final four proposed landing sites for the Curiosity rover, part of the MSL mission. It was voted a close second after Gale crater by a team of scientists.

MRO discovered iron/magnesium smectites here. This mineral requires water to form.

== Eberswalde Delta ==
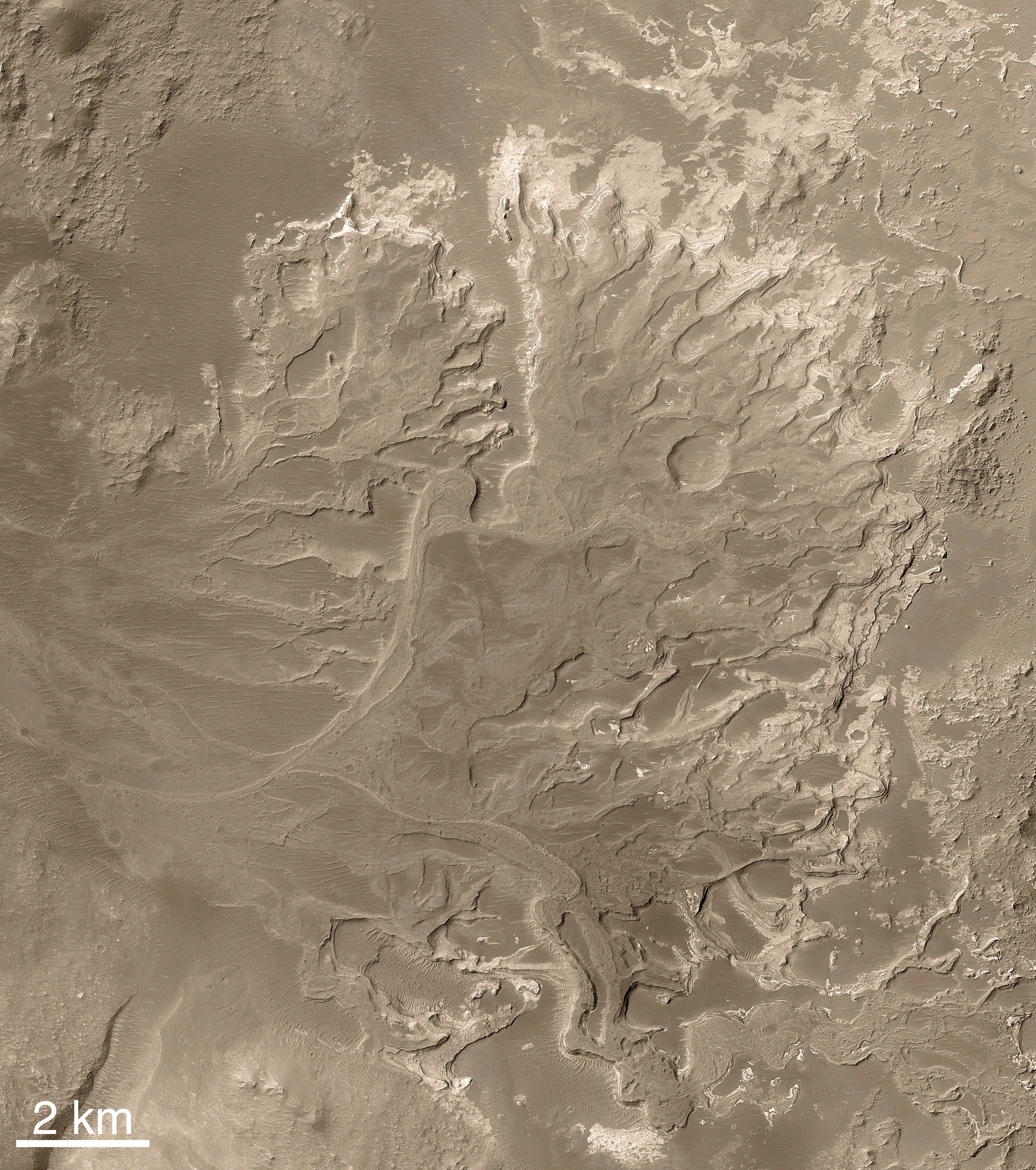
The delta, seen by MGS

The crater contains inverted relief, an exhumed delta formed by the flow of a liquid, most likely water. The series of valleys leading into the delta "drain" an area of approximately 4000 km^{2}. The surface area of the delta is 115 km^{2}, measuring 13 km by 11 km. The delta was discovered from images acquired by the Mars Global Surveyor in 2003, operated Malin Space Science Systems. Eberswalde delta has six lobes and is about 100 meters thick.

The delta also provides unambiguous evidence that some Martian sedimentary rocks have been deposited in a liquid. The meandering of the channels provides evidence to support this. Additional sediments were deposited on top of the delta, burying it. The deposits in the channels formed sedimentary rock. As the surrounding softer sediments were eroded away, the delta was exhumed, but inverted. Some layers of the delta contain clay. Finding clay is significant because it forms in water with a pH close to neutral. This type of environment would support life, and clay can form well-preserved fossils.

Many craters once contained lakes. The delta in Eberswalde Crater is strong evidence that a lake once existed here.

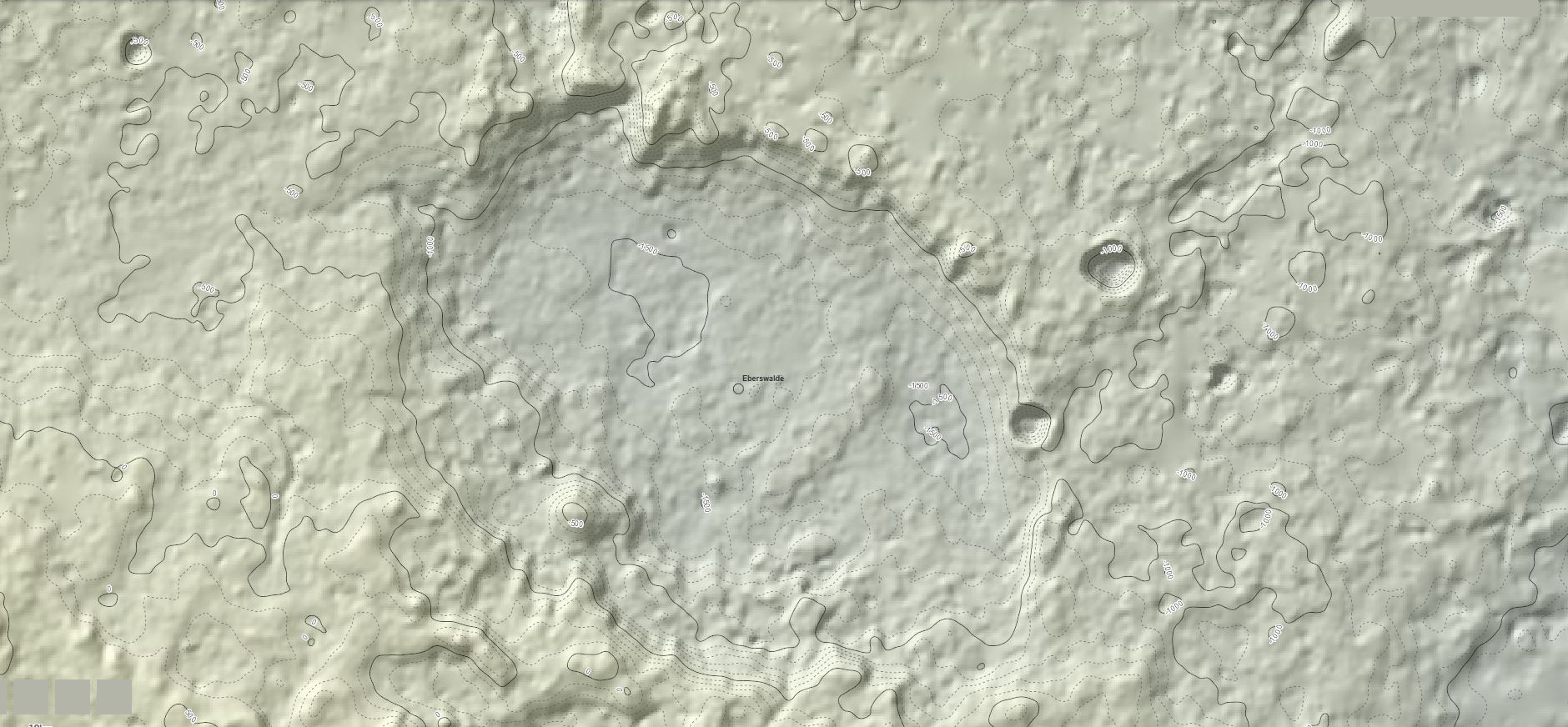
A topographic map created using Mars Orbiter Laser Altimeter (MOLA) data. This map shows the elevation Eberswald crater relative to Martian areoid.

Based on an estimate by Moore et al. in 2003 of flow volume to the crater at 700 m^{3}/s, it is estimated that it would take twenty years to completely fill the crater, ignoring evaporation and infiltration. However, this is unlikely because it is hypothesized that the delta was not formed in a permanent lake but rather a series of short lacustrine episodes on the order of years. This suggests that the Martian climate at the Noachian epoch time of formation was characterized by a series of short, wet spells rather than a sustained wet climate.

== See also ==
- Geography of Mars
- Impact crater
- Impact event
- Lakes on Mars
- List of craters on Mars
- Mars Science Laboratory
- Ore resources on Mars
- Planetary nomenclature
- River delta - the terrestrial equivalent
- Water on Mars
