= Martian craters =

There are a number of different types of craters that have been observed and studied on Mars. Many of them are shaped by the effects of impacts into ice-rich ground.

== Rampart craters ==
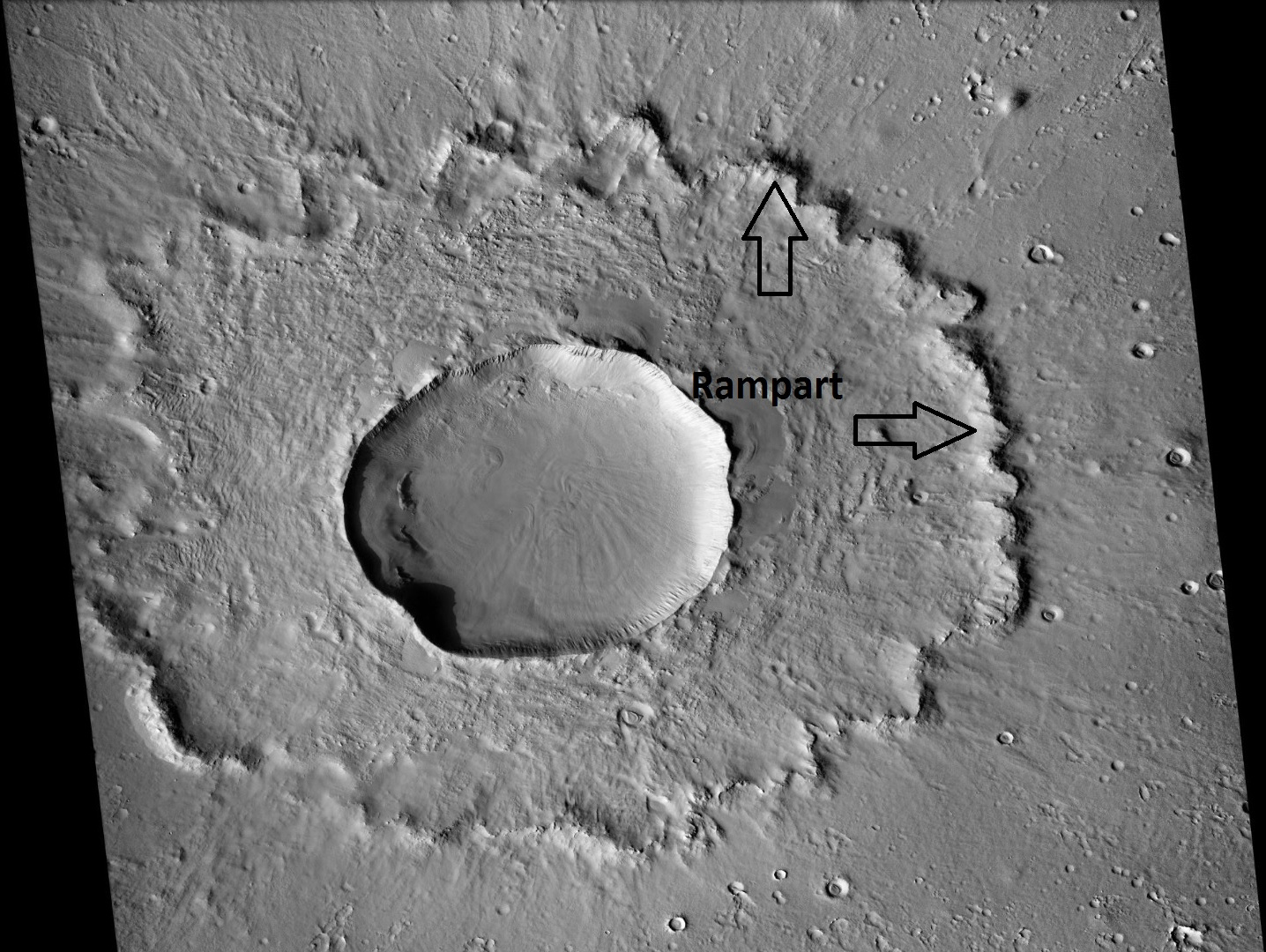
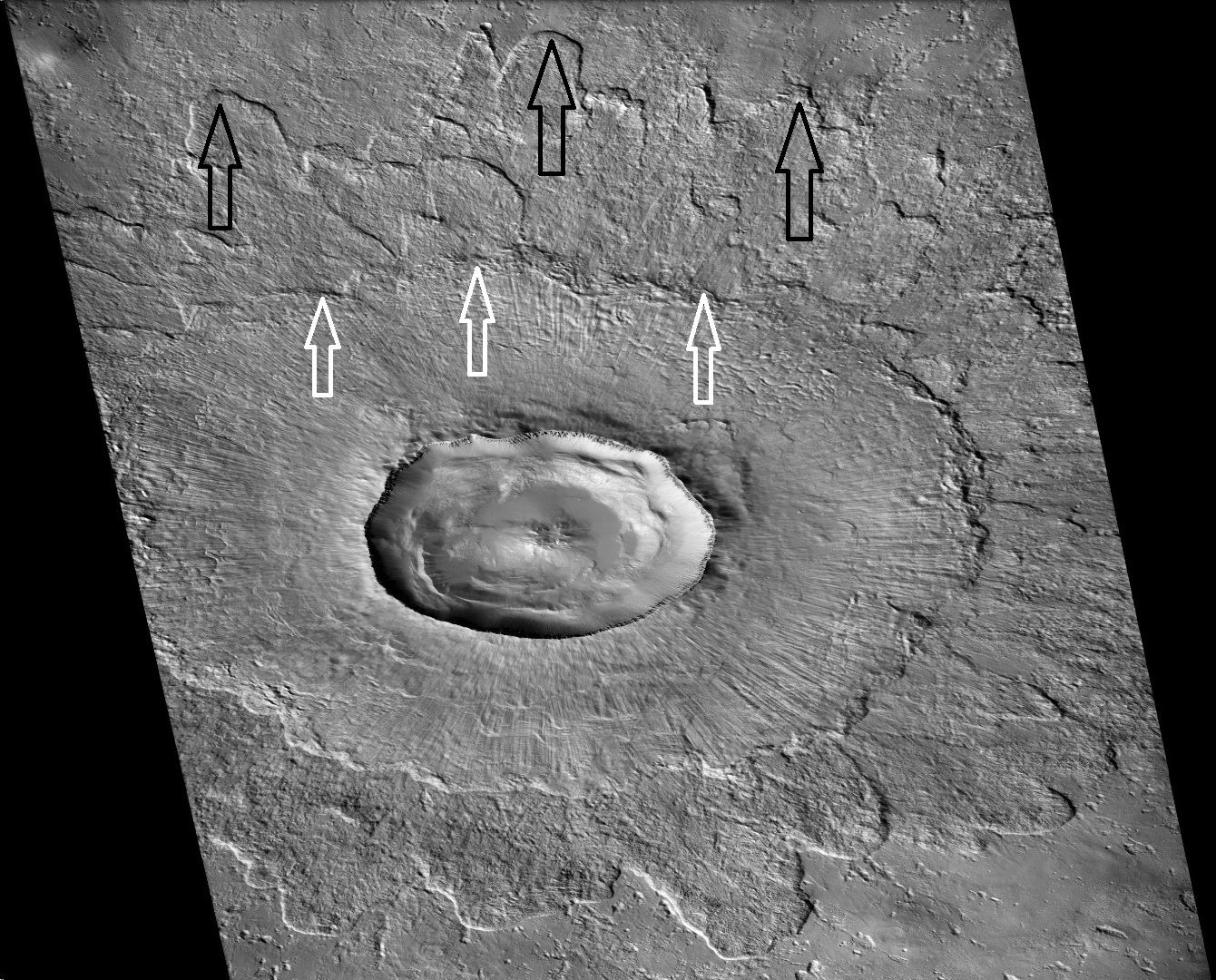
(top) An unnamed rampart crater of the single-layered ejecta type
(bottom) Steinheim, which exhibits multiple ejecta layers

Rampart craters shows fluidized ejecta features. They look like mud was formed during the impact. There are several basic types of rampart craters.

The single-layered ejecta type has a single rampart at the edge of the ejecta. It is thought that these impacted into an icy layer, but did not go through the layer.

Another rampart crater in the double-layer ejection crater. Its ejecta has two lobes. Studies have demonstrated that these can be formed from impacts that went all the way through an upper, icy layer and penetrated into a rocky layer that lies beneath the icy layer.

A third type of rampart crater, the multiple-layered ejecta crater, is similar to a double-layer crater, but it has more than two lobes or layers of ejecta.

A study of the distribution of these craters demonstrated that the thickness of a frozen layer on Mars varies from about 1.3 km (equator) to 3.3 km (poles). This represents a great deal of frozen water. It would be equal to 200 meters of water spread over the entire planet, if one assumes the ground has 20% pore space. The researchers assumed that the single-layer ejecta craters would all be within the icy layer, but the double and multiple layer ejecta craters would always penetrate the icy layer. By finding an average of the largest single-layer ejecta crater depth and the smallest multiple-layer ejecta crater depth, the thickness of the icy layer, called the cryosphere was determined.

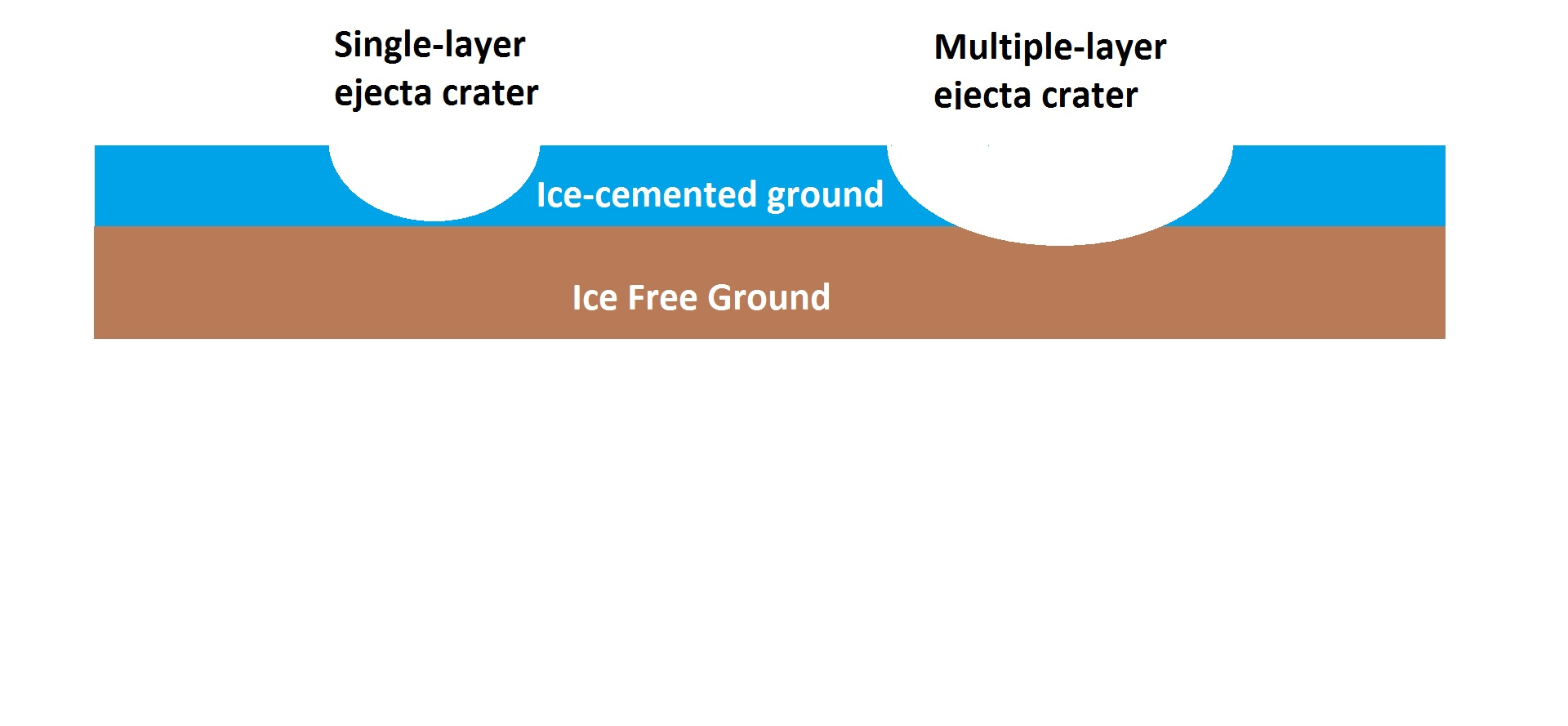
Single-layer ejecta craters only penetrate into the icy upper layer, as shown on the left. Multiple-layer ejecta craters go all the way through the icy layer and somewhat into the lower, ice-free layer (right).

== Pancake craters ==
In the Mariner and Viking missions a type of crater was found that was called a "pancake crater." It is similar to a rampart crater, but does not have a rampart. The ejecta is flat along its whole area, like a pancake. Under higher resolutions it resembles a double-layer crater that has degraded. These craters are found in the same latitudes as double-layer craters (40-65 degrees). It has been suggested that they are just the inner layer of a double-layer crater in which the outer, thin layer has eroded. Craters classified as pancakes in Viking images, turned out to be double-layer craters when seen at higher resolutions by later spacecraft.

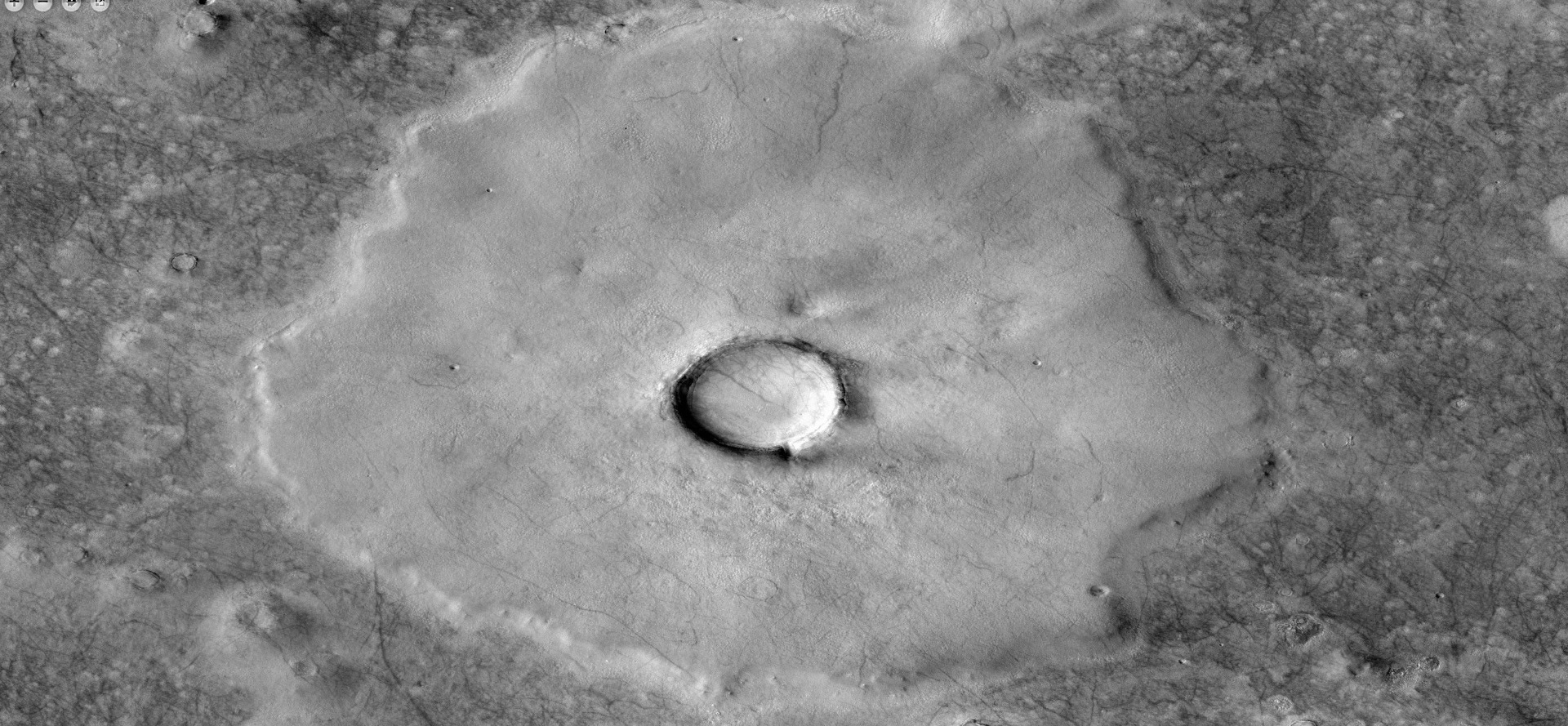
Pancake crater, note the flat top and lack of a visible rampart. Image is from CTX.

== LARLE craters ==
LARLE craters are characterized by a crater and normal layered ejecta pattern surrounded by an extensive but thin outer deposit which ends in a flame-like shape. The name LARLE stands ‘low-aspect-ratio layered ejecta. The low aspect part of the name refers to the outer part being very thin. This outer thin layer is thought to erode away and the resulting crater would be a pedestal crater. If the outer layer were not there, the crater would be the same size as a pedestal crater.

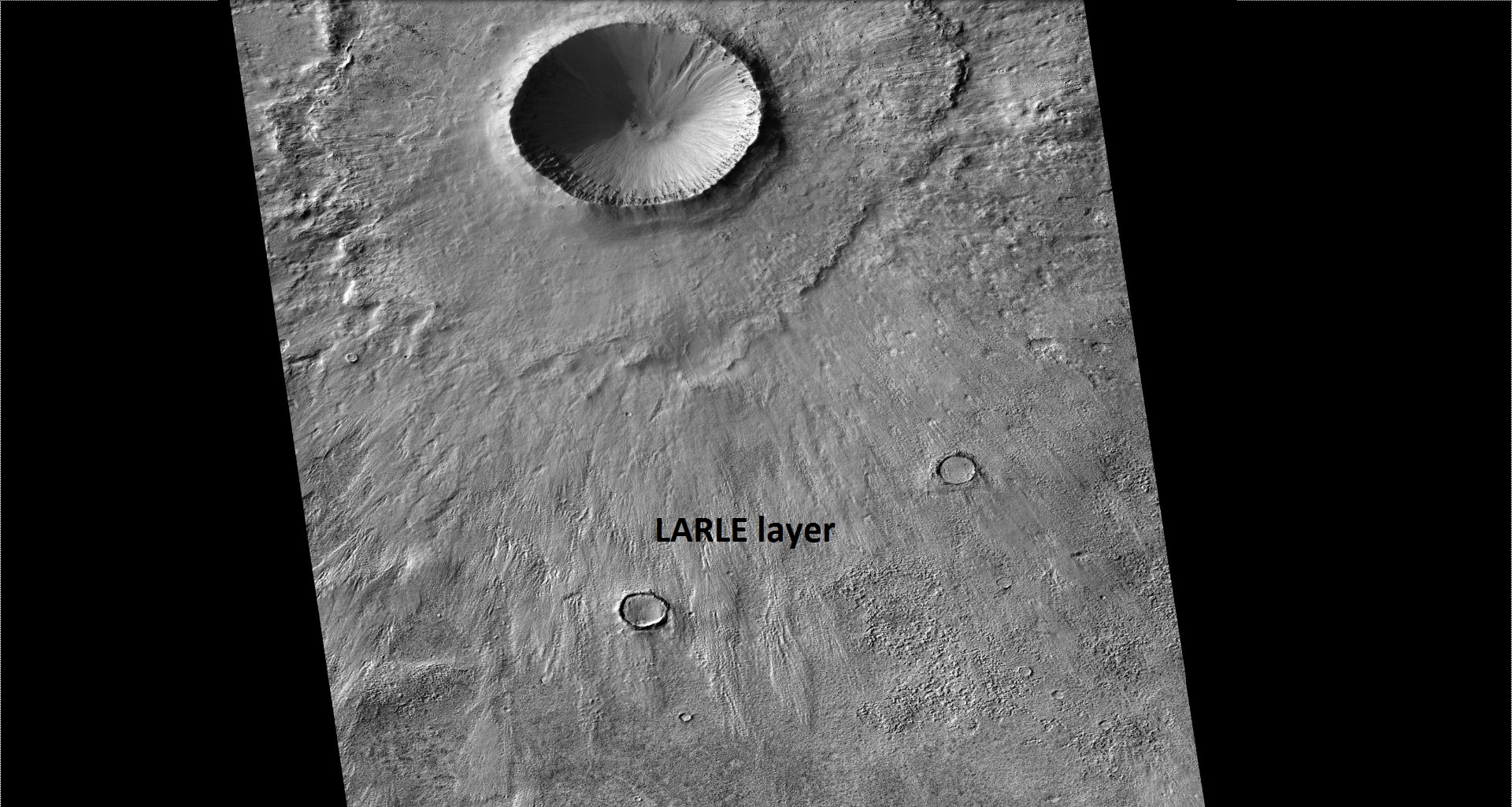
LARLE crater, as seen by CTX LARLE layer that is composed of fine-grained material is labeled. It may be eroded away and a pedestal crater will remain.

== Pedestal craters ==
A pedestal crater has its ejecta sitting above the surrounding terrain and thereby forming a raised platform (like a pedestal). They form when an impact crater ejects material which forms an erosion-resistant layer, thus causing the immediate area to erode more slowly than the rest of the region.

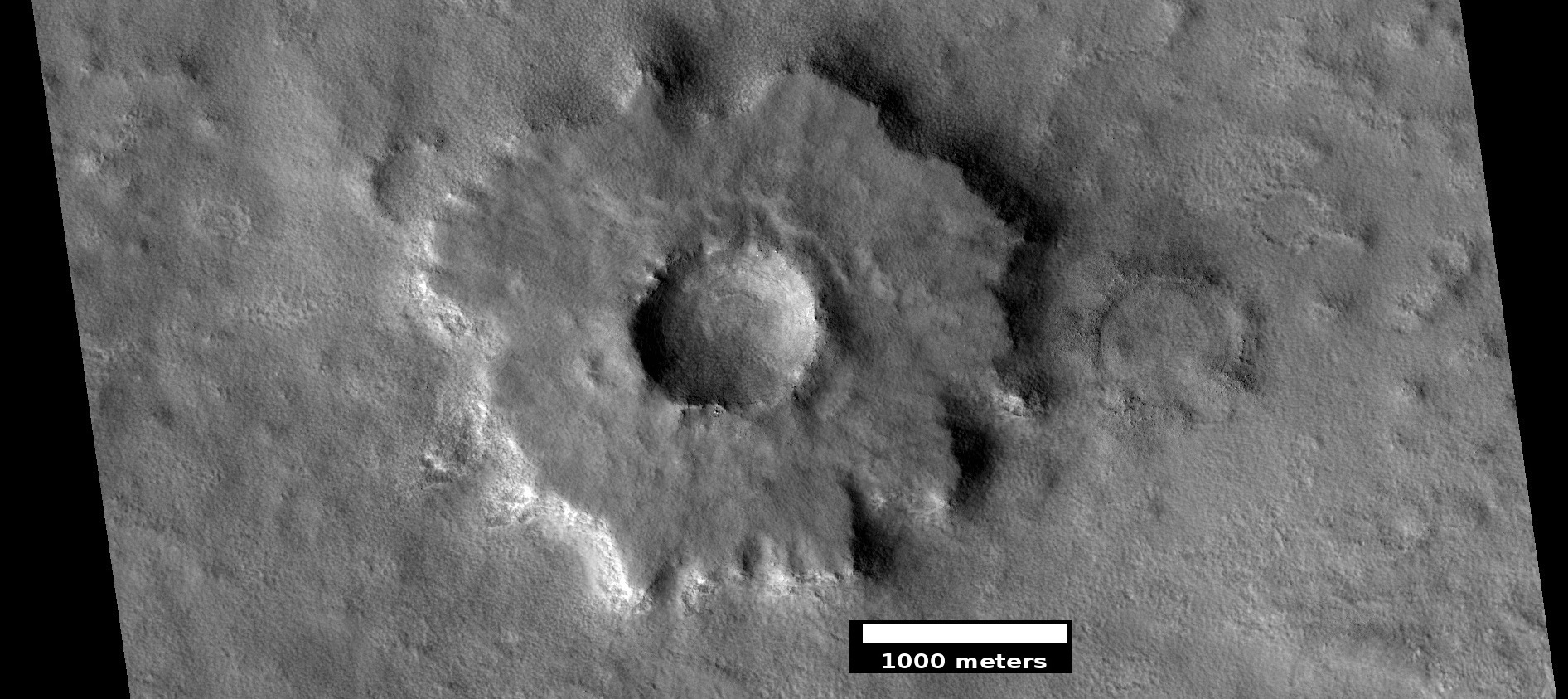
Pedestal crater, as seen by HiRISE under HiWish program. Top layer has protected the lower material from being eroded.

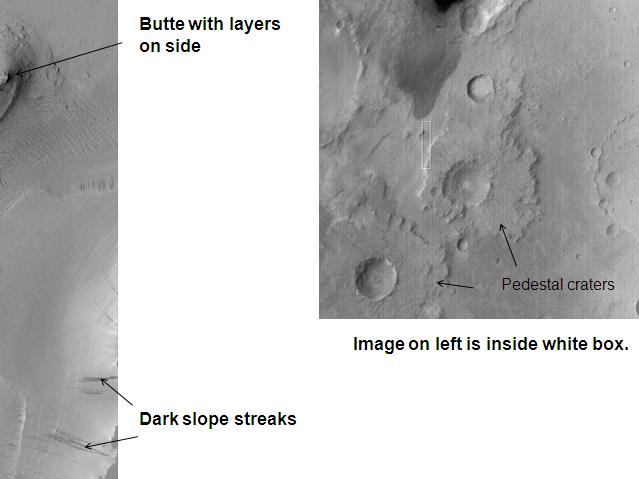
Tikonravev Crater floor in Arabia quadrangle, as seen by Mars Global Surveyor

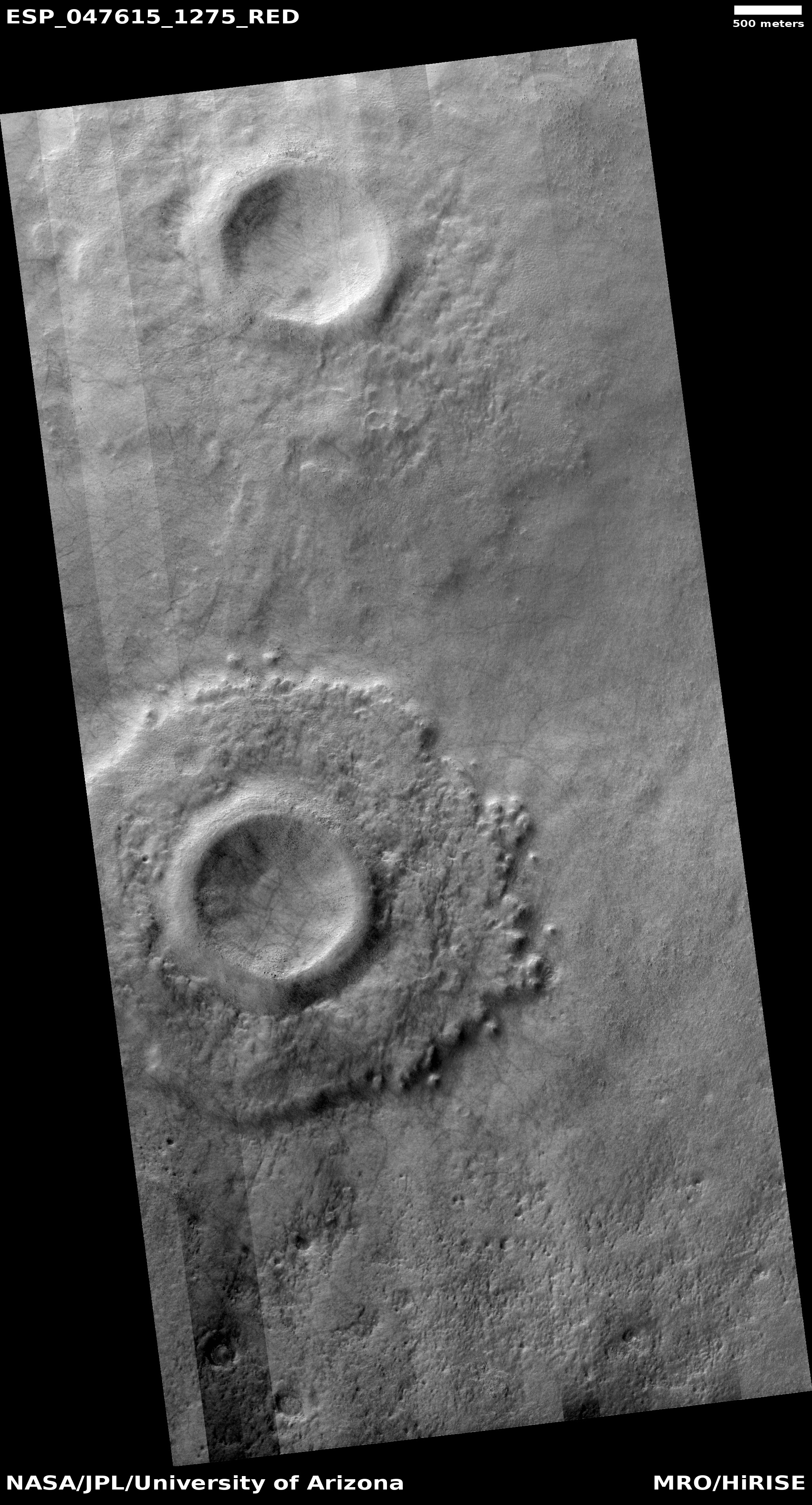
Pedestal crater, as seen by HiRISE under HiWish program Location is Hellas quadrangle

== Expanded craters ==
An expanded crater is a type of secondary impact crater. Large impacts often create swarms of small secondary craters from the debris that is blasted out as a consequence of the impact. Studies of a type of secondary craters, called expanded craters, have given us insights into places where abundant ice may be present in the ground. Expanded craters have lost their rims, this may be because any rim that was once present has collapsed into the crater during expansion or, lost its ice, if composed of ice.

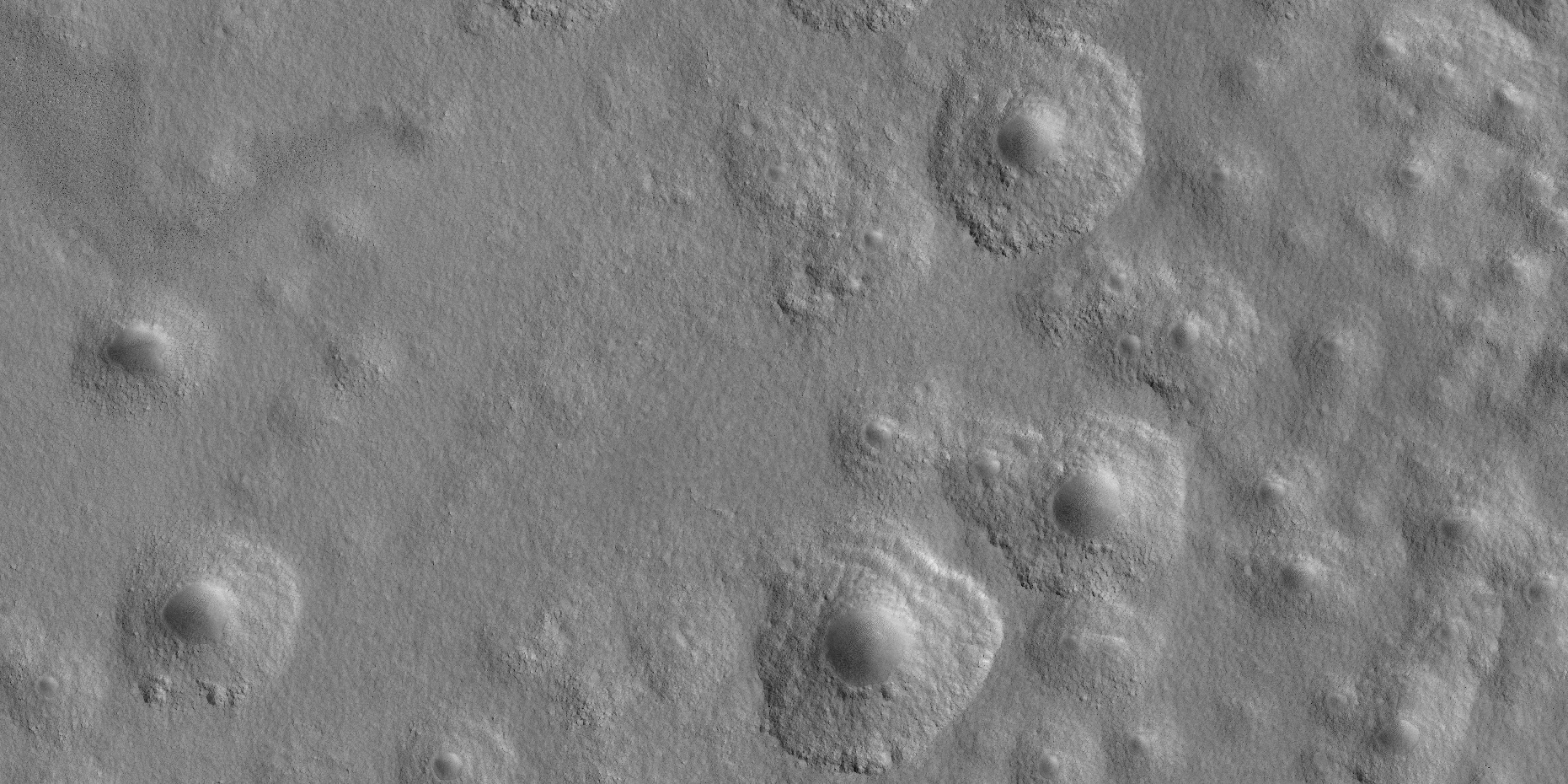
Close view of expanded craters, as seen by HiRISE After the impact, ice left the ground and made the crater larger in diameter.

== See also ==
- Areography (geography of Mars)
- Expanded crater
- Geology of Mars
- Impact depth
- Impact event
- LARLE crater
- Pedestal crater
- Rampart crater
- Ray system
- Secondary crater
