= Rampart crater =

Specific type of impact crater

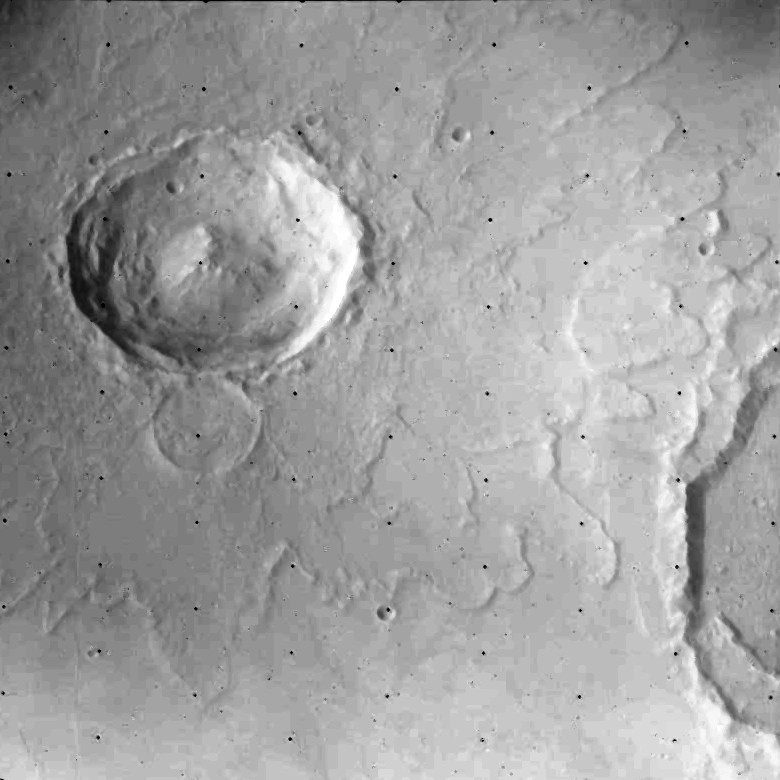
The rampart crater Yuty and its ejecta. This is classified as a multiple-layer ejecta crater.

Rampart craters are a specific type of impact crater which are accompanied by distinctive fluidized ejecta features found mainly on Mars. Only one example is known on Earth, the Nördlinger Ries impact structure in Germany. A rampart crater displays an ejecta with a low ridge along its edge. Usually, rampart craters show a lobate outer margin, as if material moved along the surface, rather than flying up and down in a ballistic trajectory. The flows sometimes are diverted around small obstacles, instead of falling on them. The ejecta look as if they move as a mudflow. Some of the shapes of rampart craters can be duplicated by shooting projectiles into mud. Although rampart craters can be found all over Mars, the smaller ones are only found in the high latitudes where ice is predicted to be close to the surface. It seems that the impact has to be powerful enough to penetrate to the level of the subsurface ice. Since ice is thought to be close to the surface in latitudes far from the equator, it does not take a large impact to reach the ice level. Based on images from the Viking program in the 1970s, it is generally accepted that rampart craters are evidence of ice or liquid water beneath the surface of Mars. The impact melts or boils the water in the subsurface producing a distinctive pattern of material surrounding the crater.

Ryan Schwegman described double layered ejecta (DLE) craters as showing two distinct layers of ejecta that appear to have been put in place as a mobile, ground-hugging flow. His measurements suggest that ejecta mobility (the distance ejecta travels from the crater rim) typically goes up with increasing latitude and may reflect ice concentration. That is the higher the latitude, the greater the ice content. The lobateness (curved shape of the perimeter of ejecta) usually goes down with increasing latitude. Furthermore, DLEs on sedimentary ground seem to display higher ejecta mobility than those on volcanic surfaces.

A detailed discussion of various kinds of Martian craters, including double-layer ejecta craters (rampart craters) can be found in a 2014 paper by David Weiss and James Head.

== Single-layered ejecta craters ==
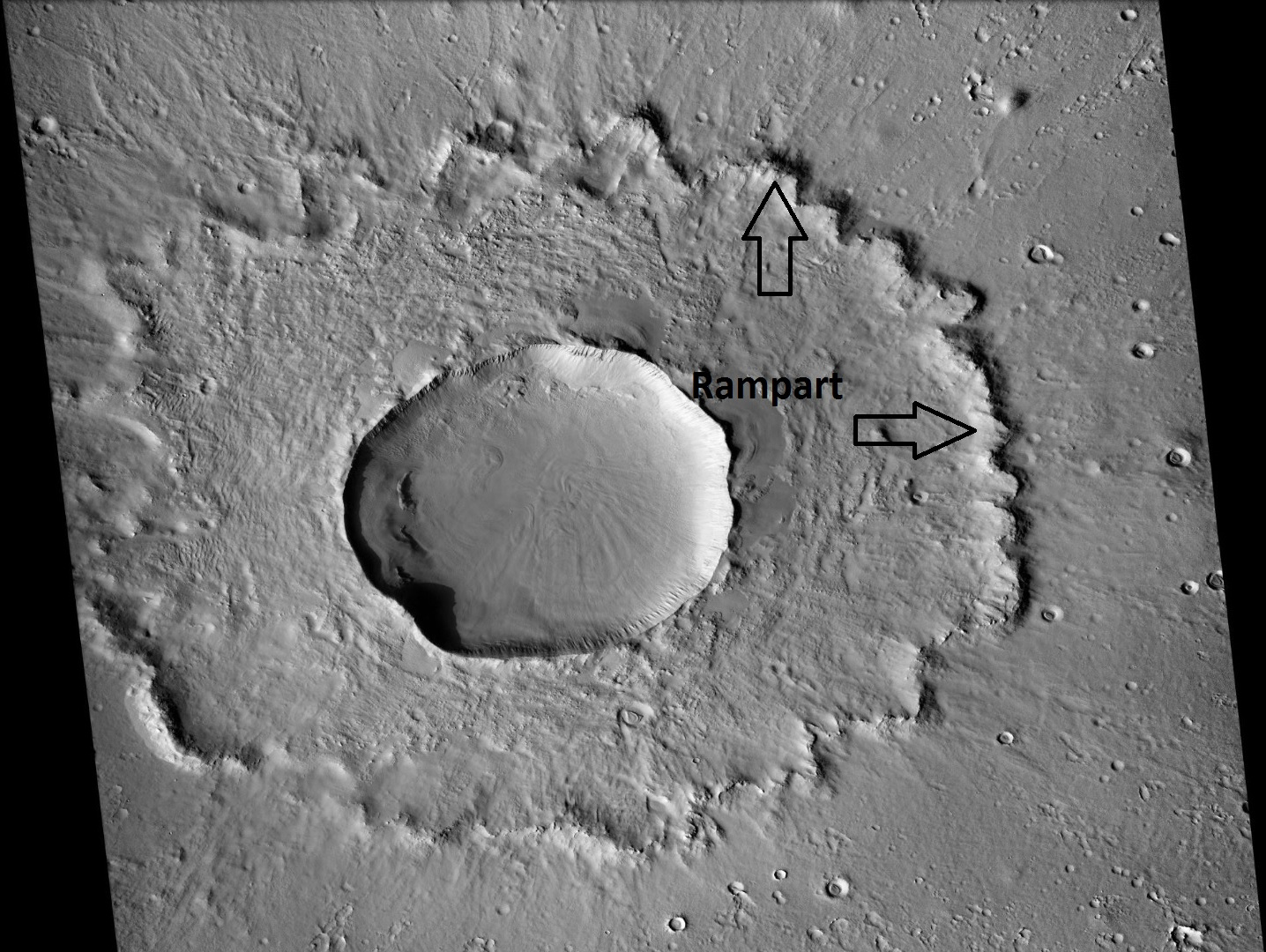
Rampart crater of the single-layered ejecta type. Arrows indicate the outer edge, called the rampart.

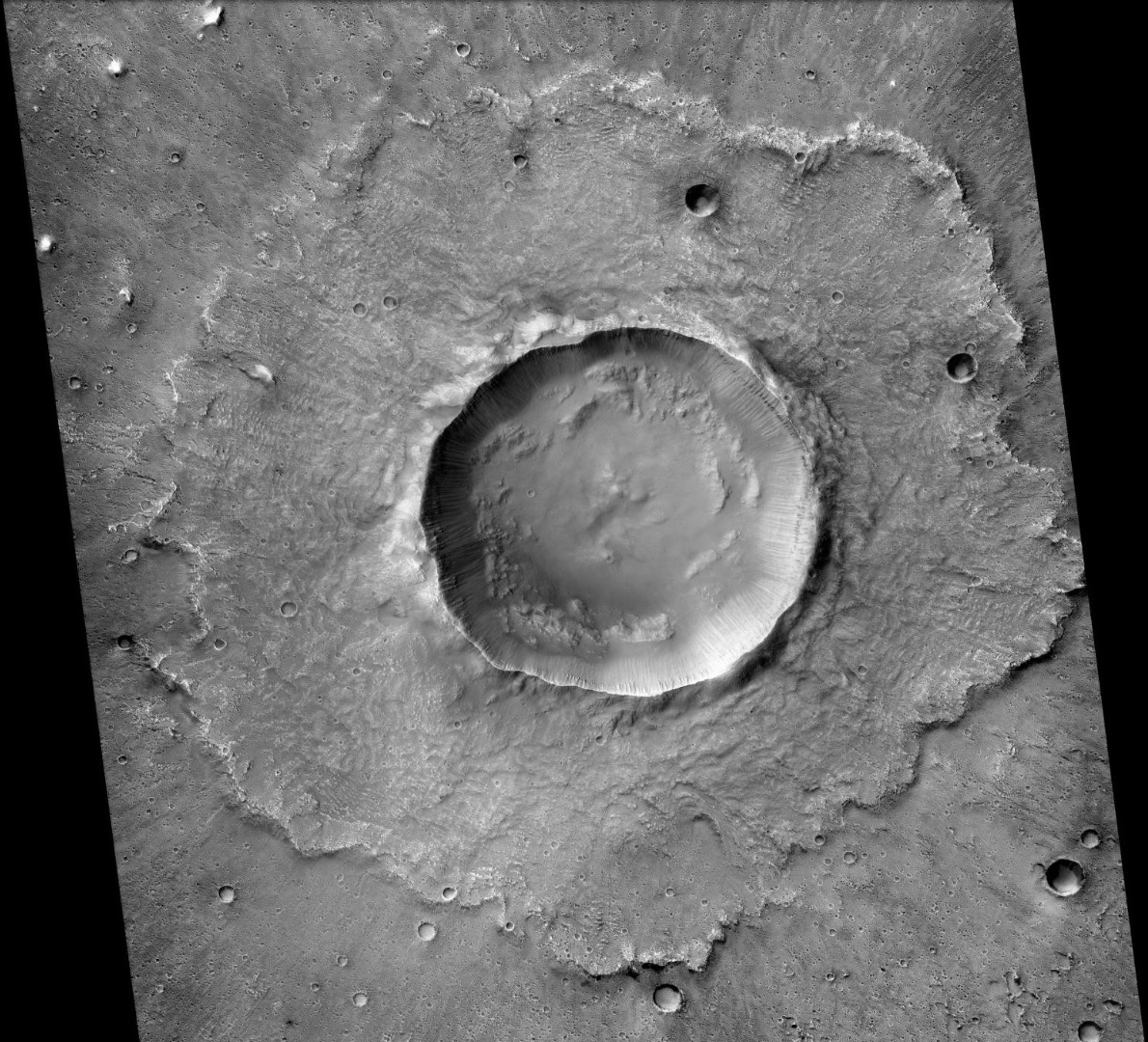
Punsk crater, as seen by CTX camera (on MRO).

Single-layered ejecta craters are one type of rampart crater. They have one ejecta lobe that extends 1 to 1.5 crater radii from the rim of the crater. They have an average diameter of 10 km. Although present at all latitudes, they are most common near the equator. Their average size increases the more distant from the equator. It has been suggested that these types of craters are produced by impact into icy ground. Specifically, it is an impact that does not go entirely through the icy layer. The increase in size away from the equator is explained by a possible greater thickness in the icy layer away from the equator.

== Double and multiple layered ejecta craters ==
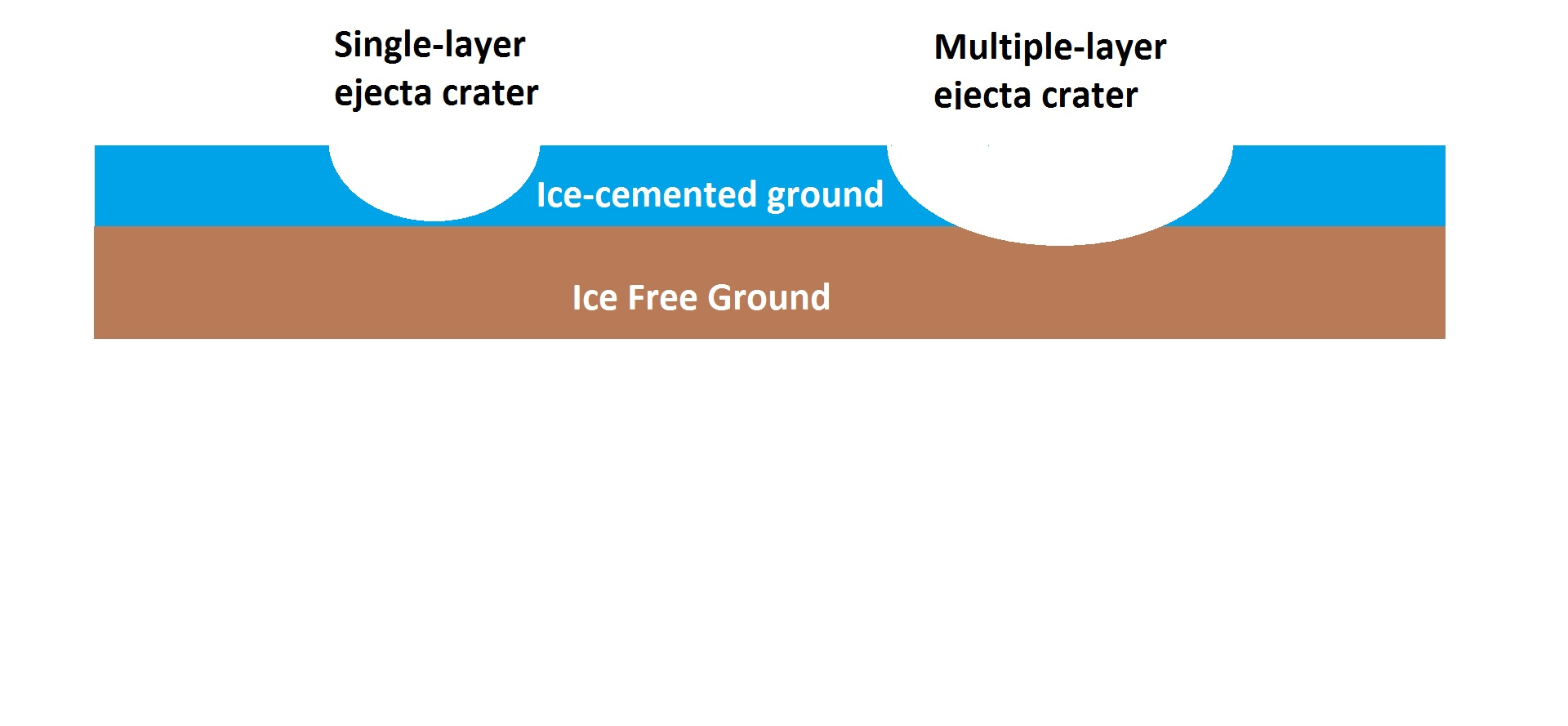
Single-layer ejecta craters only penetrate into the icy upper layer, as shown on the left. Multiple-layer ejecta craters go all the way through the icy layer and somewhat into the lower, ice-free layer (right).

Another type of rampart crater is called a double-layered ejecta (DLE) crater. It displays two lobes of ejecta. Related to these are multiple-layered ejecta (MLE) craters that have more than 2 or more layers of ejecta. They are larger than single layered ejecta craters, having an average diameter of 22 km. Their ejecta are about 2.2 radii from the crater rim. They are more concentrated near the equator (mostly between 40 degrees from the equator).

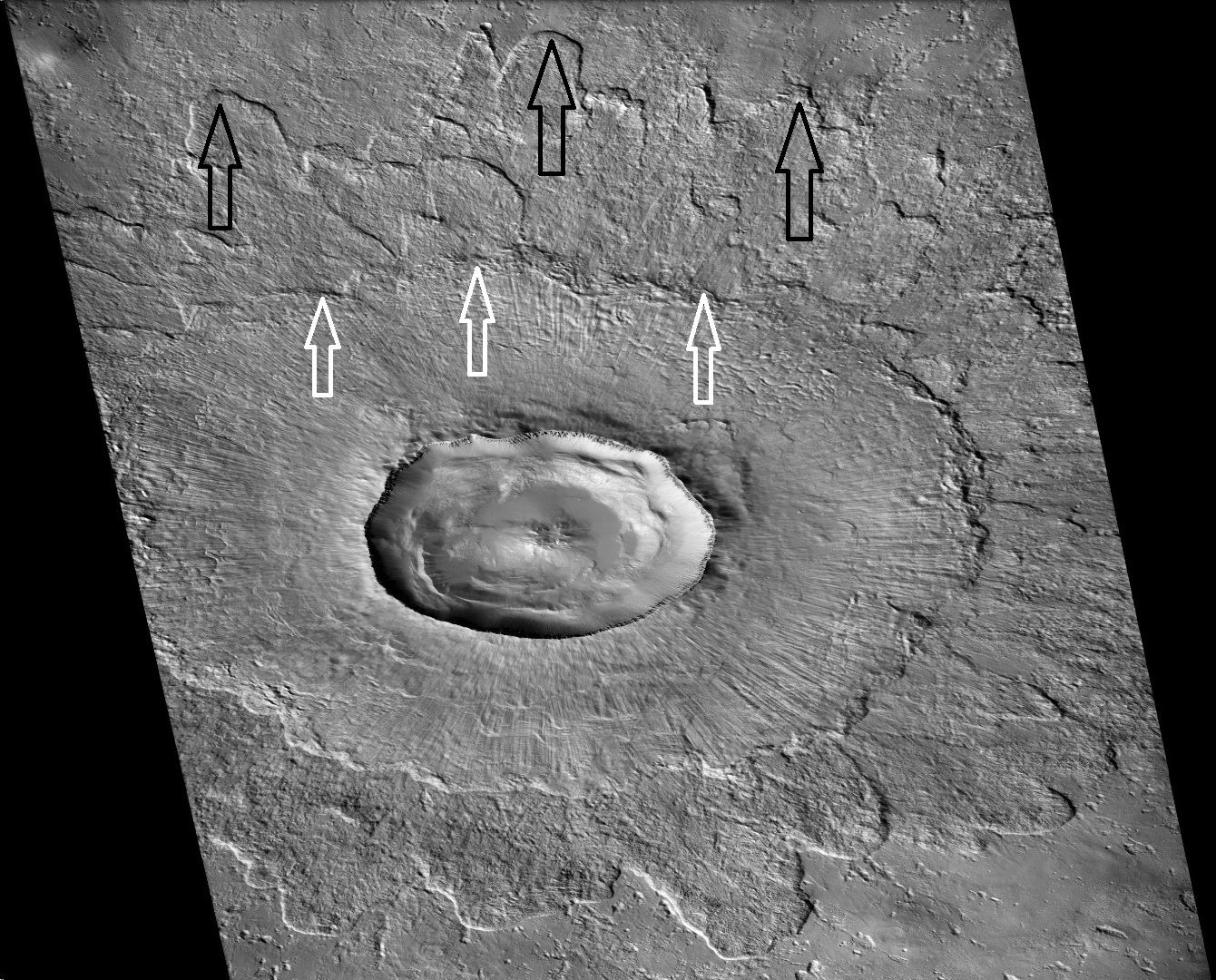
Steinheim crater which shows more than one layer of ejecta. These are called double-layered ejecta craters.

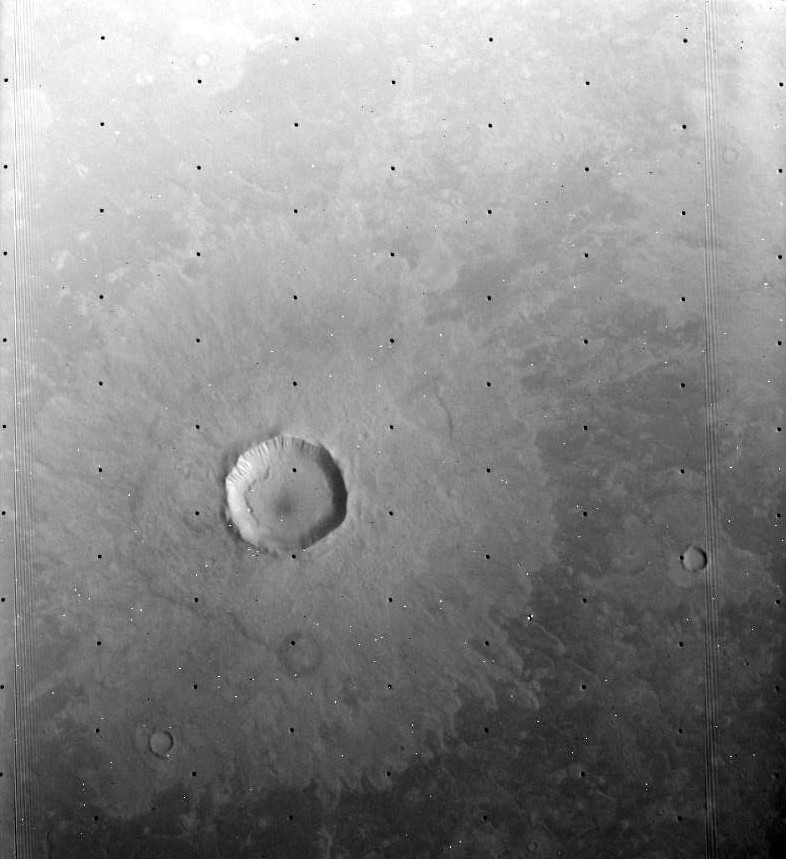
Elath is an example of a double-layered ejecta crater. Viking image.

Evidence leads researchers to believe that they result from an impact that goes through an icy layer and into a rocky layer. There may be more of them closer to the equator because the icy layer is not as thick there; hence more impacts will penetrate all the way through the icy layer and into the rocky layer. They are larger at all latitudes than single layer ejecta craters. The icy layer has been called by different names: cryosphere, permafrost, and ice-cemented cryosphere.

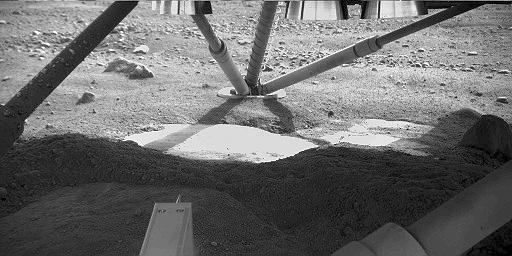
View underneath Phoenix lander towards south foot pad, showing patchy exposures of a bright surface that was later confirmed to be water ice, as predicted by theory and detected by Mars Odyssey.

Researchers have analyzed the distribution of both of these craters to determine the thickness of an icy layer that may surround the total surface of Mars. The depth of a crater has been found to be about one tenth of its diameter. So by measuring the diameter, the depth can be easily found. They mapped the position and size of all of these craters and then determined the maximum size of single-layered craters and the smallest size for multiple-layered craters for each latitude. Remember the single-layered ejecta crater does not penetrate the icy layer, but the multiple-layered does. An average of those should give the thickness of the icy layer. From such an analysis, they determined that the icy layer or cryosphere varies from about 1.3 km (equator) to 3.3 km (poles). This represents a great deal of frozen water. It would be equal to 200 meters of water spread over the entire planet, if one assumes 20% pore space.

The Phoenix lander confirmed the existence of large amounts of water ice in the northern regions of Mars. This finding was predicted by theory and was measured from orbit by the Mars Odyssey instruments, so the idea that rampart crater size shows the depth to ice was confirmed by other space probes. The image below from the Phoenix lander shows ice that was exposed by the descent engines.

They are normally small craters found in the far north or south parts of the planet

== Pancake craters ==
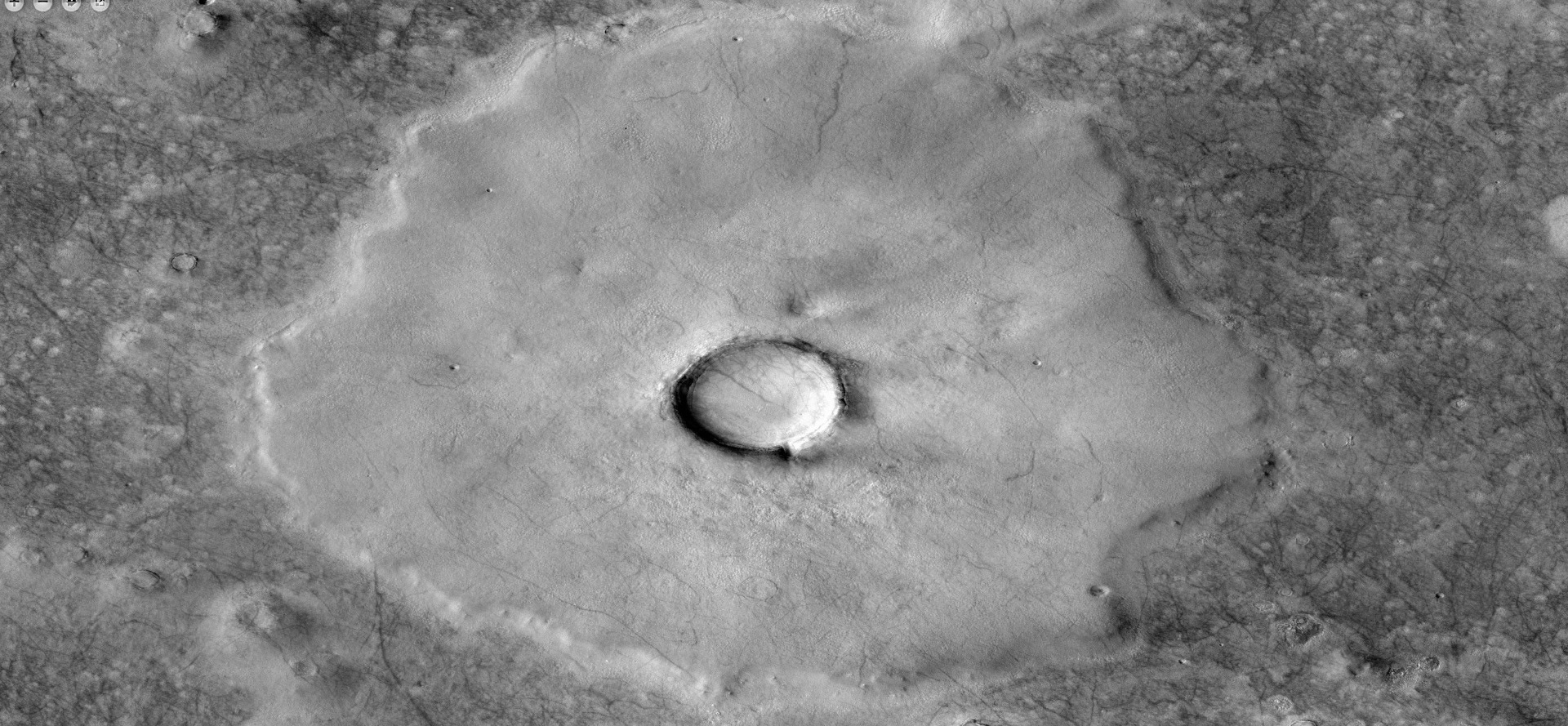
A pancake crater. Note the flat top and lack of a visible rampart.

In the Mariner and Viking mission a type of crater was found that was called a "pancake crater." It is similar to a rampart crater, but does not have a rampart. The ejecta is flat along its whole area, like a pancake. Under higher resolutions it resembles a double-layer crater that has degraded. These craters are found in the same latitudes as double-layer craters (40–65 degrees). It has been suggested that they are just the inner layer of a double-layer crater in which the outer, thin layer has eroded. Craters classified as pancakes in Viking images, turned out to be double-layer craters when seen at higher resolutions by later spacecraft.

== See also ==
- Geology of Mars
- Impact event
- LARLE crater
- Martian Craters
- Pedestal crater
- Peak ring (crater)
