= Pedestal crater =

Type of impact carter

In planetary geology, a pedestal crater is a crater with its ejecta sitting above the surrounding terrain and thereby forming a raised platform (like a pedestal). They form when an impact crater ejects material which forms an erosion-resistant layer, thus causing the immediate area to erode more slowly than the rest of the region. Some pedestals have been accurately measured to be hundreds of meters above the surrounding area. This means that hundreds of meters of material were eroded away. The result is that both the crater and its ejecta blanket stand above the surroundings. Pedestal craters were first observed during the Mariner missions.

== Description ==
With further study, researchers have divided related craters into three different classes. and have advanced ideas about how they were formed. Excess ejecta craters and perched craters are larger than pedestal craters. All three have similar shapes with the bowl of the crater and an area around the bowl sitting above the surrounding surface. Excess ejecta craters and perched craters show ejecta deposits, but pedestal craters usually do not. All are found in the same regions and all seem to lie the same distance above the surroundings—an average of close to 50 meters. The main difference between excess ejecta craters and perched craters is that the bowls of perched craters are shallow and sometimes almost full of material. Pedestal craters are near the center of a plateau that has an outward-facing scarp (cliff).

It is now believed that all three of these types of craters result from impacts into an icy layer. Excess ejecta craters and perched craters, the larger ones, penetrated completely through the ice layer and also went into a rocky lower layer. A portion of the rocky layer was deposited around the rim of the crater forming a rough ejecta deposit. That ejecta protected the area beneath it from erosion. Subsequent erosion left the craters sitting above the surrounding surface. The smaller, "pedestal craters," developed a protective covering by a different process. Simulations show that a large impact into ice would generate a great burst of heat that would be sufficient to melt some of the ice. The resulting water could dissolve salts and minerals and produce a coating resistant to erosion.

This new understanding of how these different craters have formed has helped the scientists to understand how ice-rich material was deposited in the mid-latitudes of both hemispheres a number of times in the Amazonian period on Mars, for example. During that time the obliquity (tilt) of the spin axis of Mars underwent many large variations. These changes caused the climate to change. With its current tilt, Mars has a thick deposit of ice at its poles. At times, the poles face the sun causing the polar ice to move to the mid-latitudes; it is during these times that ice-rich layers were formed.

== Gallery ==
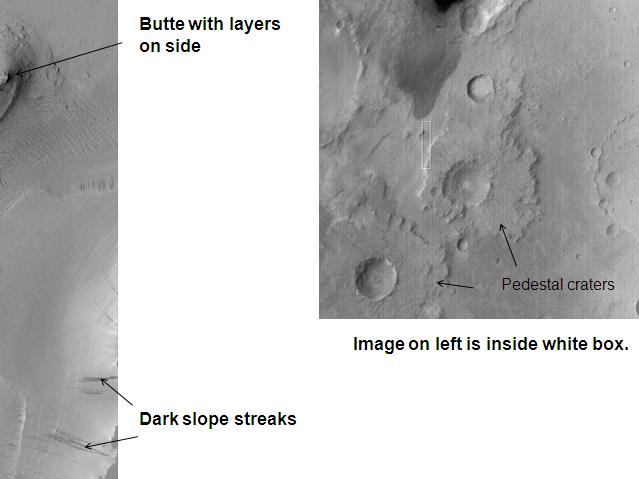
Tikhonravov Crater floor in Arabia quadrangle, as seen by Mars Global Surveyor

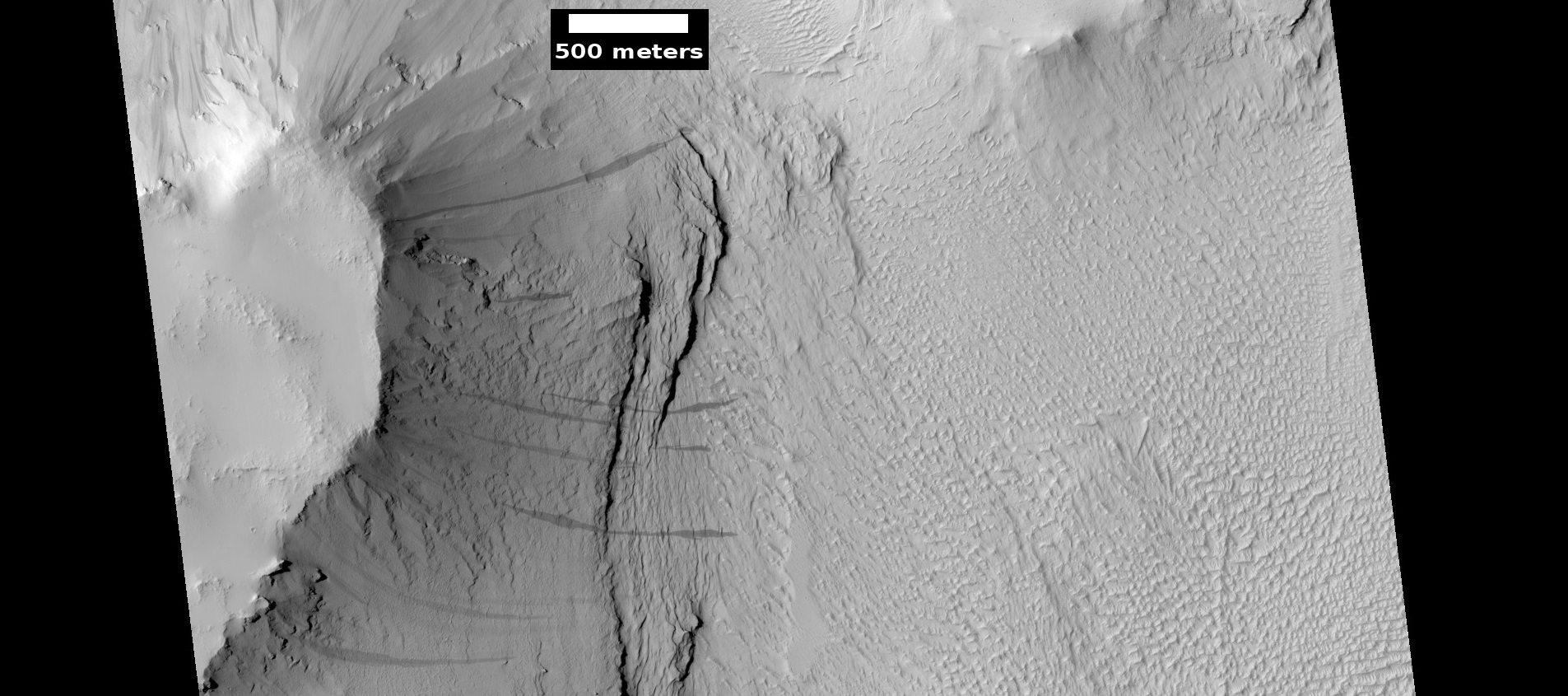
Layers under cap rock of a pedestal crater, as seen by HiRISE under HiWish program. Pedestal crater is within the much larger Tikhonravov Crater. Location is Arabia quadrangle.

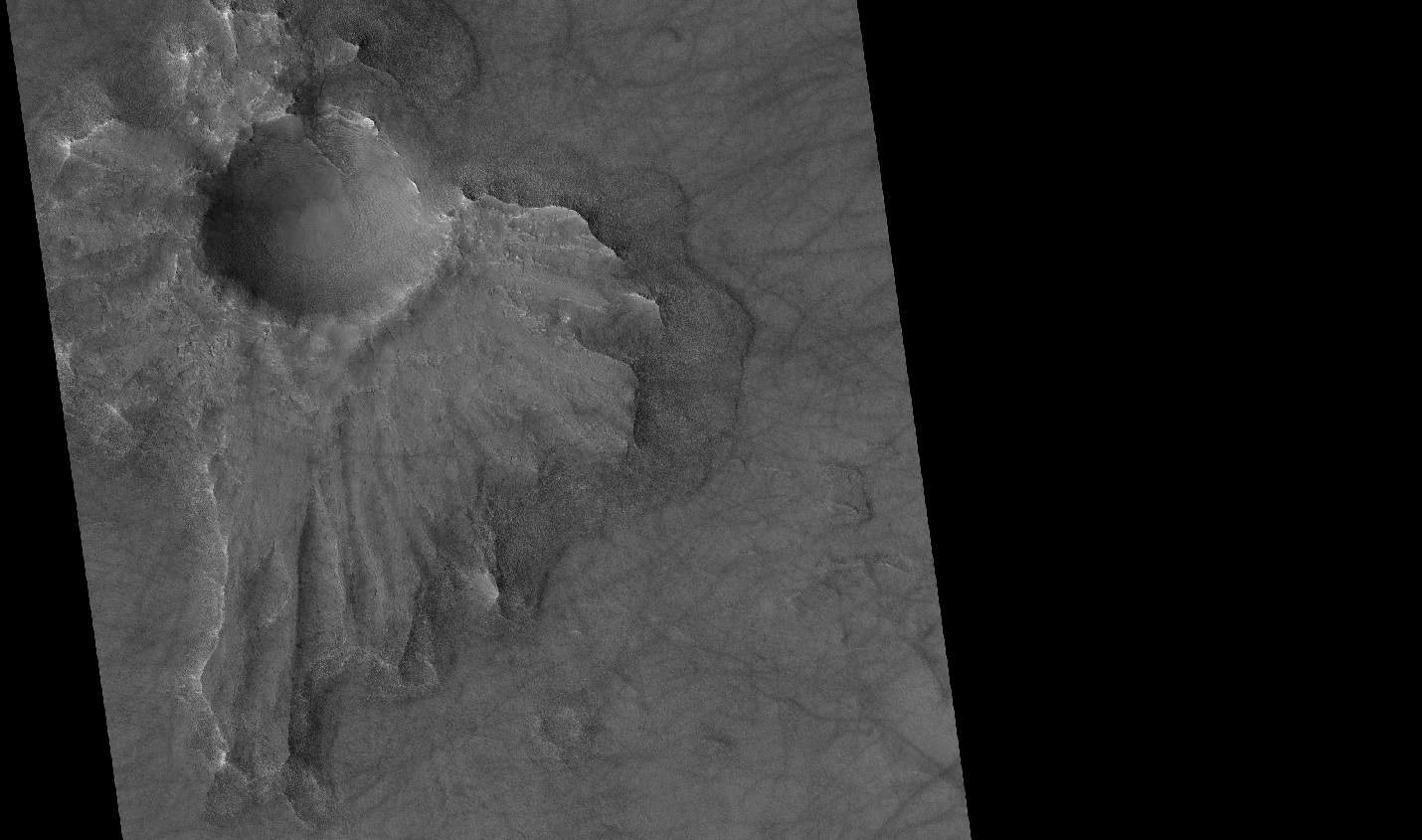
Pedestal crater, as seen by HiRISE under HiWish program The ejecta is not symmetrical around crater because the asteroid came at a low angle out of the northeast. The ejecta protected the underlying material from erosion; hence the crater looks elevated. The location is Casius quadrangle.

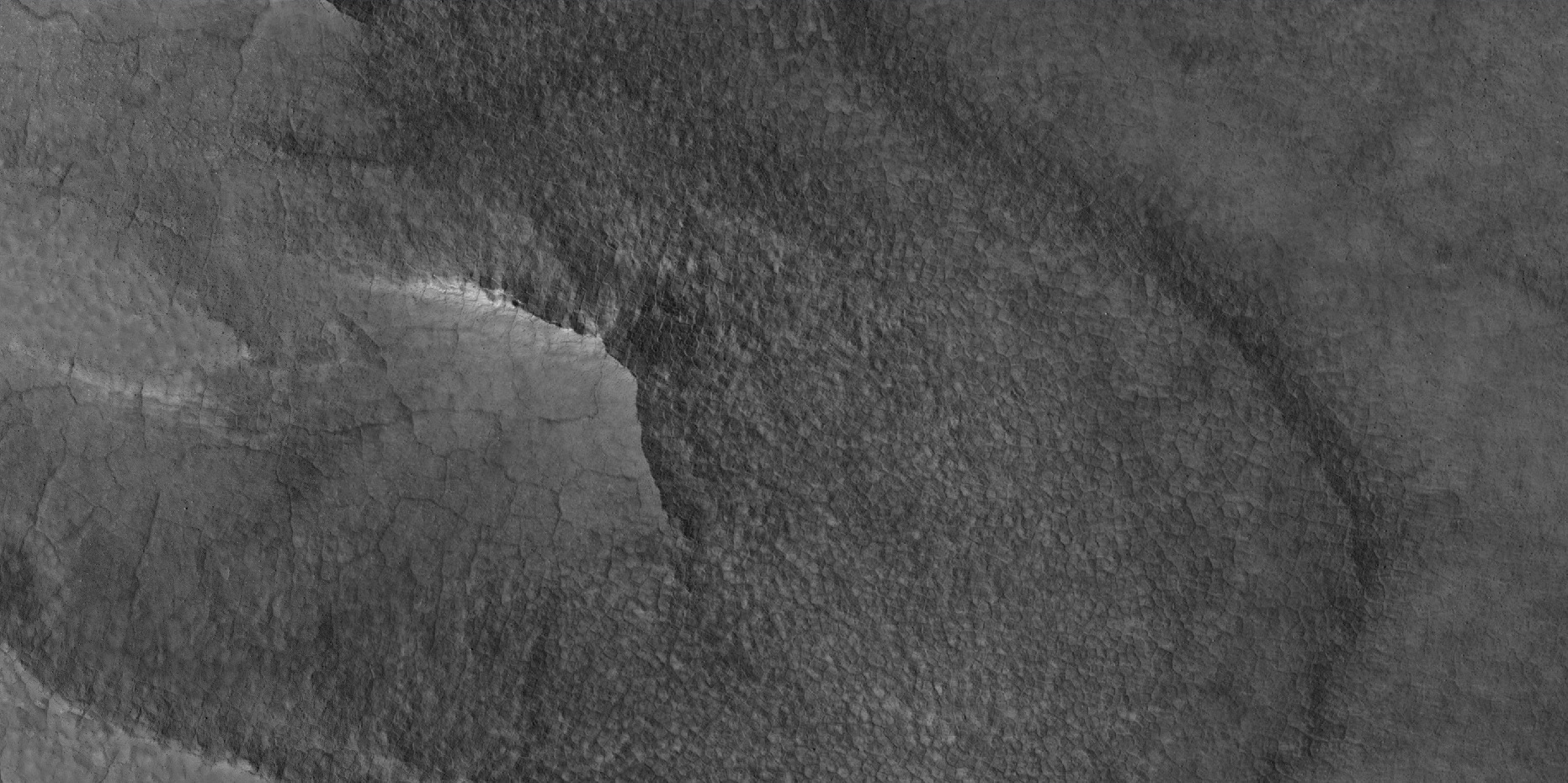
Close-up of East side (right side) of previous image of pedestal crater showing polygons on lobe. Since the margin of the crater has lobes and polygons, it is believed there is ice under the protective top. Picture taken with HiRISE under HiWish program. Note: this is an enlargement of the previous image.

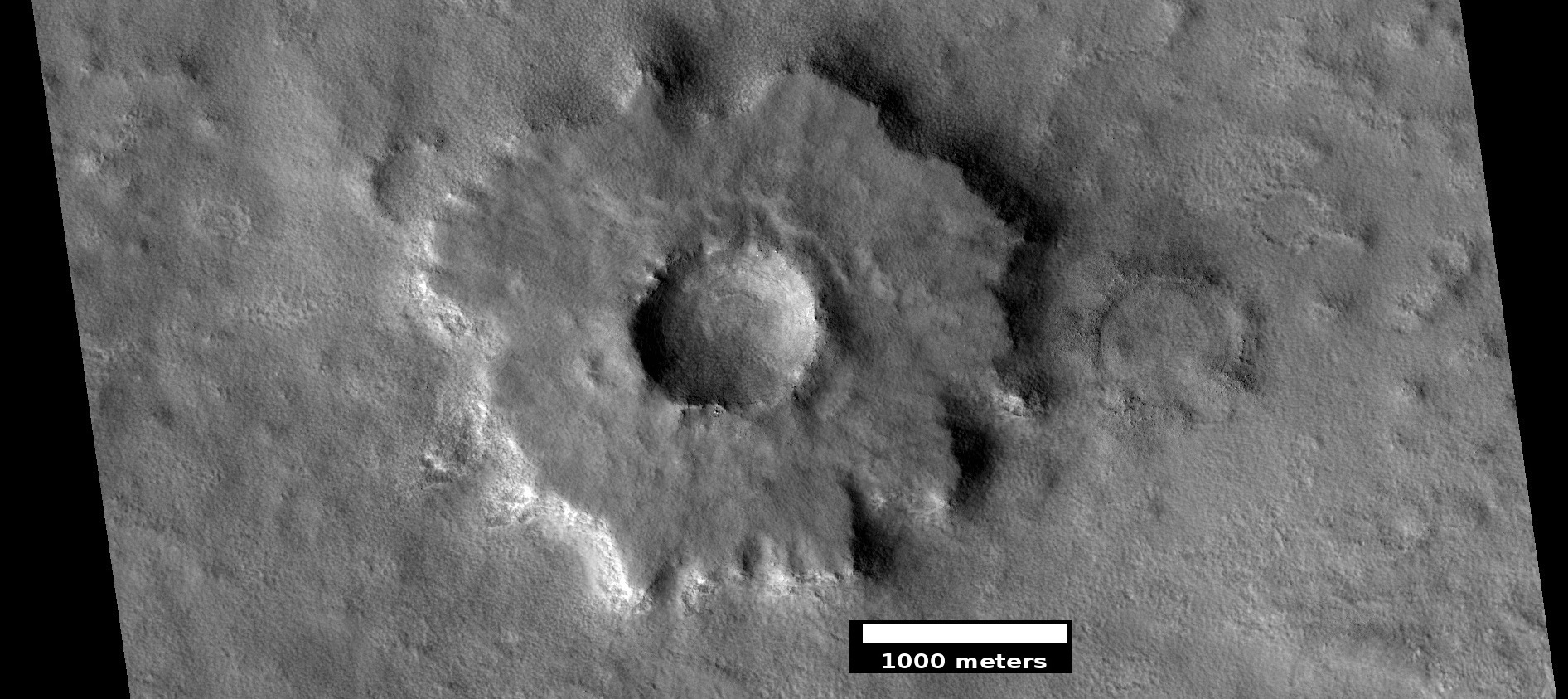
Pedestal crater, as seen by HiRISE under HiWish program. Top layer has protected the lower material from being eroded. The location is Casius quadrangle.

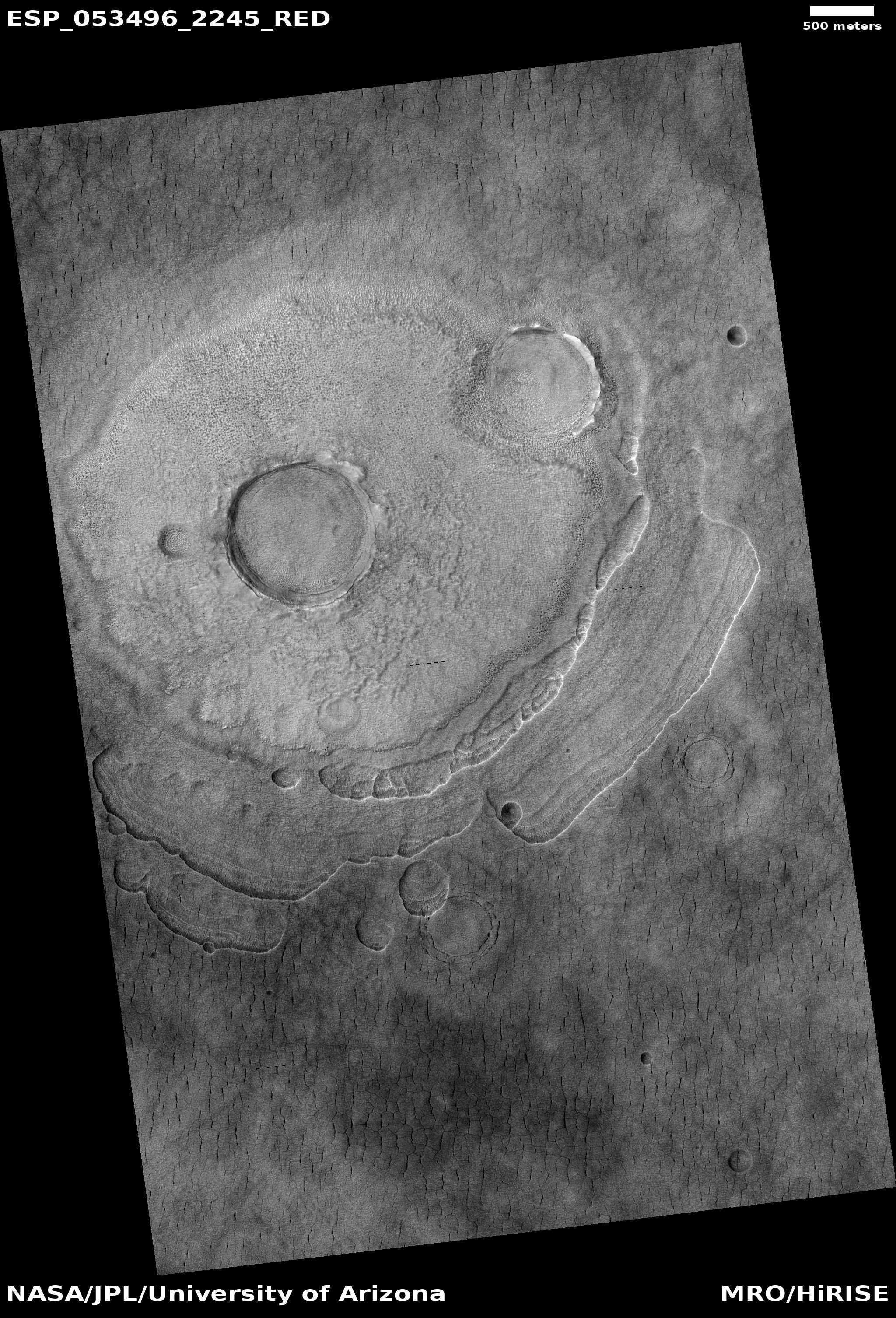
Pedestal crater, as seen by HiRISE under HiWish program Scallops are forming at the bottom edge of the pedestal. Location is Casius quadrangle.

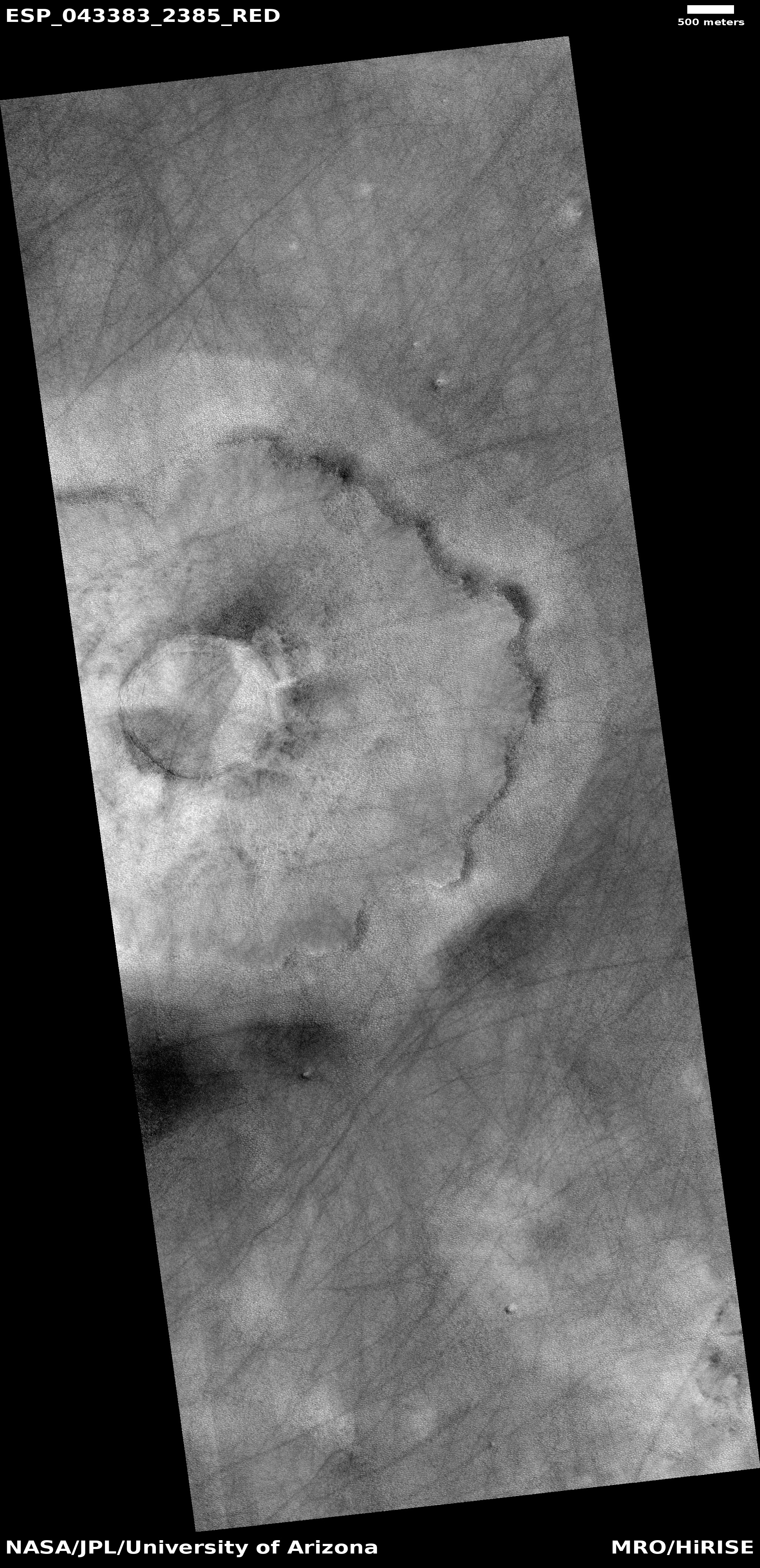
Pedestal crater, as seen by HiRISE under HiWish program Dark lines are dust devil tracks. Location is Casius quadrangle.

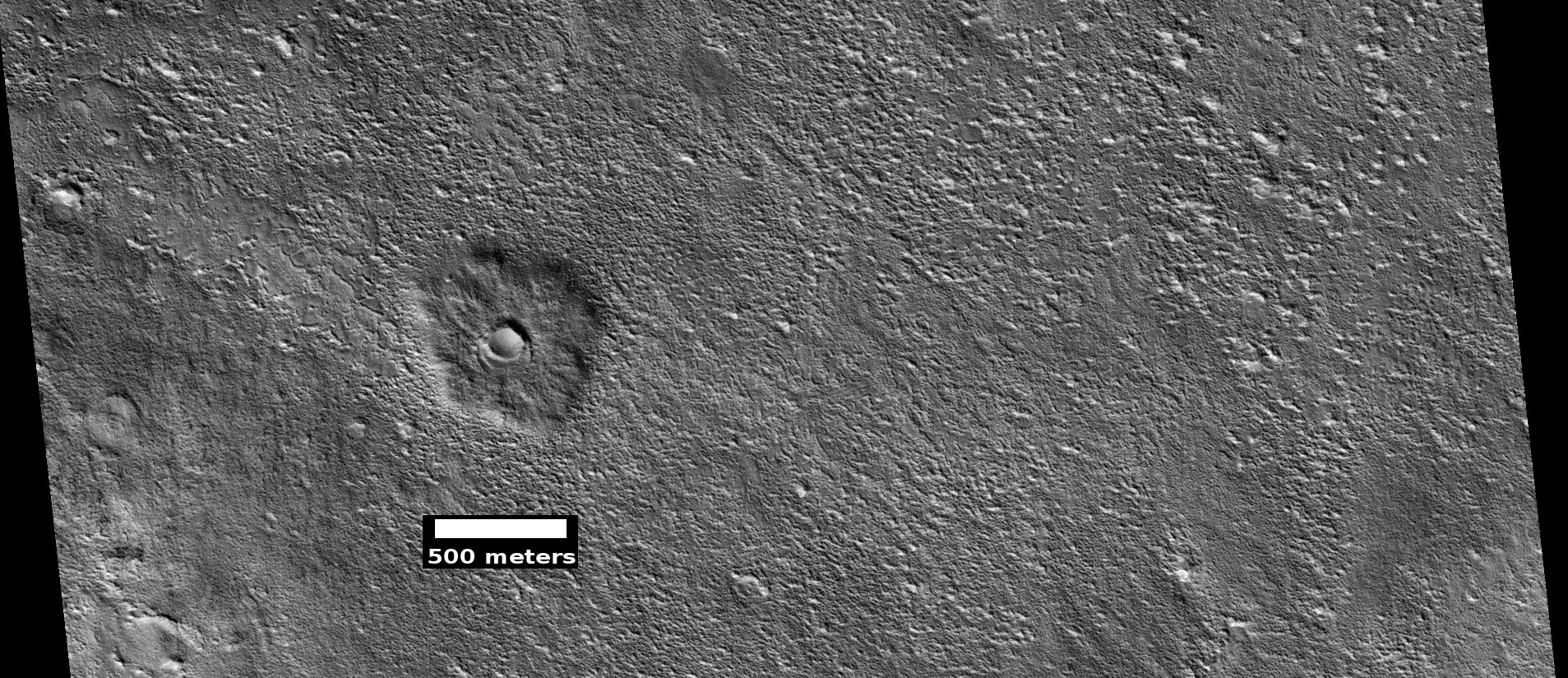
Pedestal crater, as seen by HiRISE under HiWish program Location is Cebrenia quadrangle.

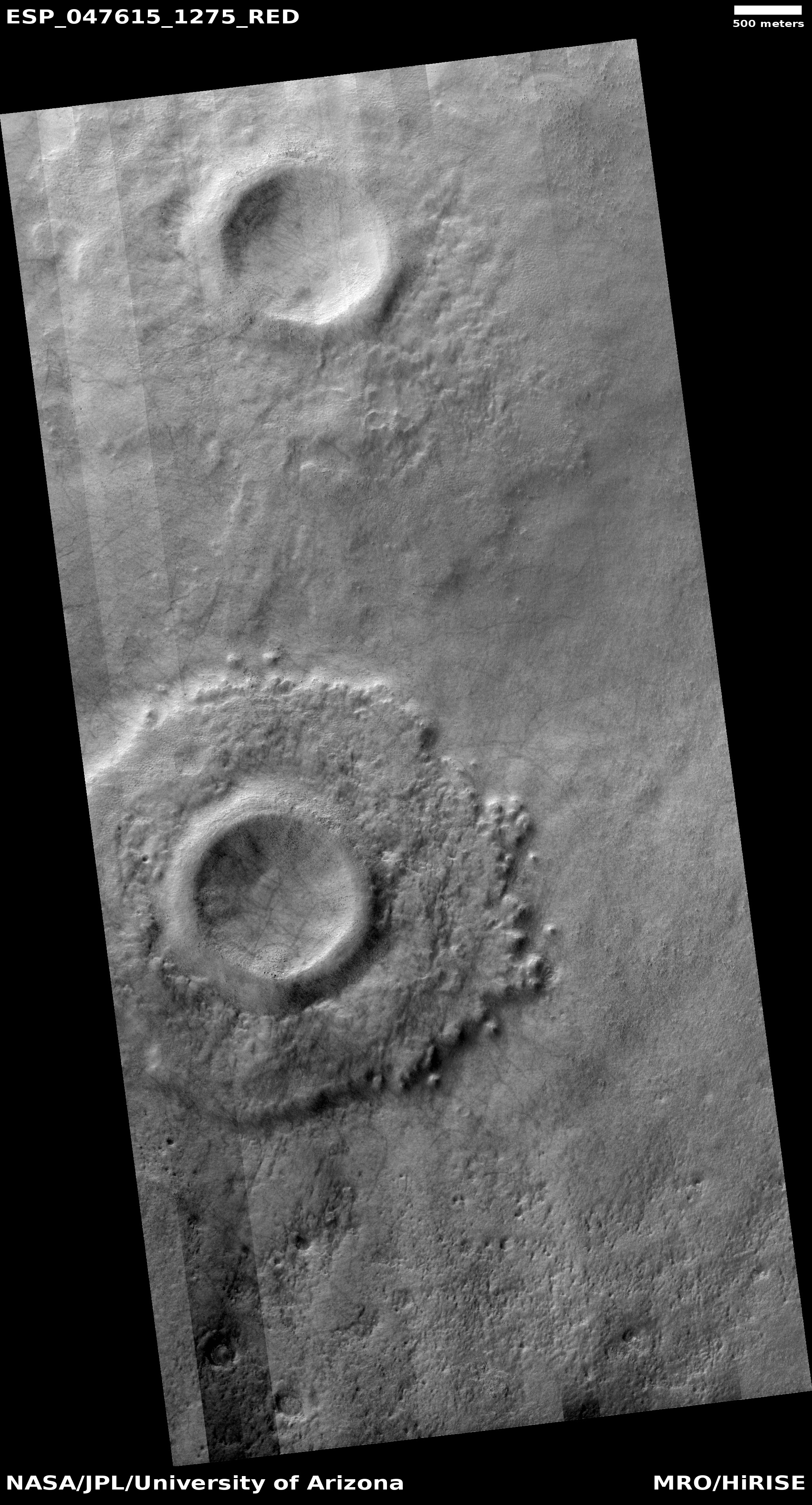
Pedestal crater, as seen by HiRISE under HiWish program Location is Hellas quadrangle.

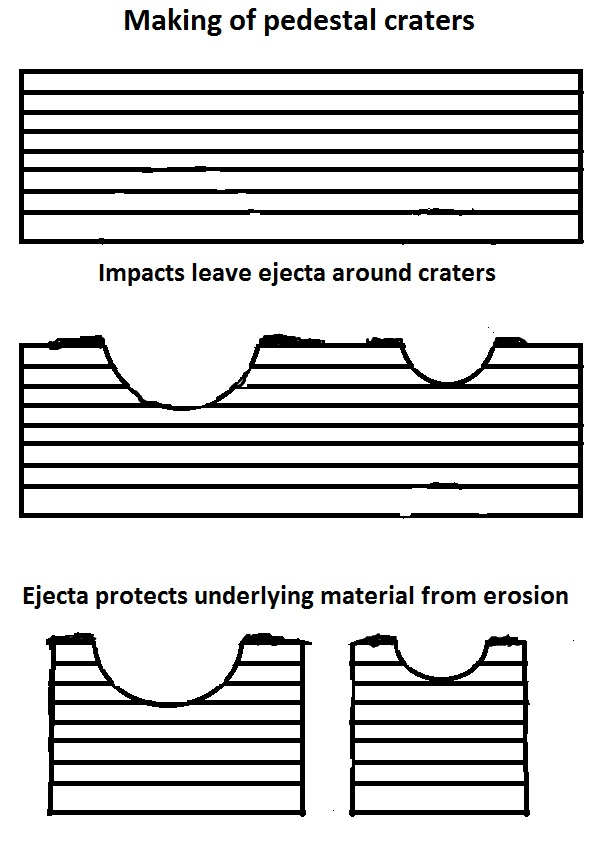
Pedestal craters form when the ejecta from impacts protect the underlying material from erosion. As a result of this process, craters appear perched above their surroundings.

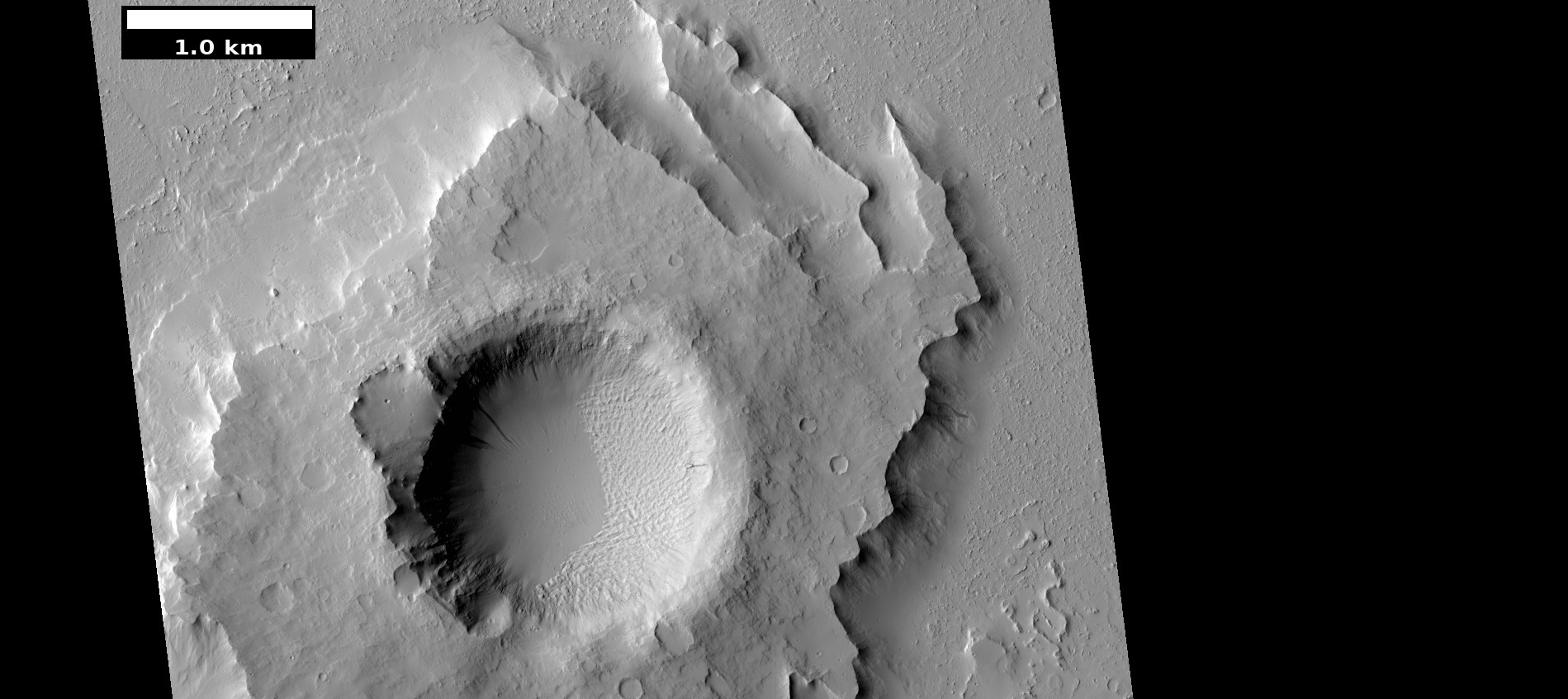
Pedestal crater with layers, as seen by HiRISE under HiWish program Location is Amazonis quadrangle.

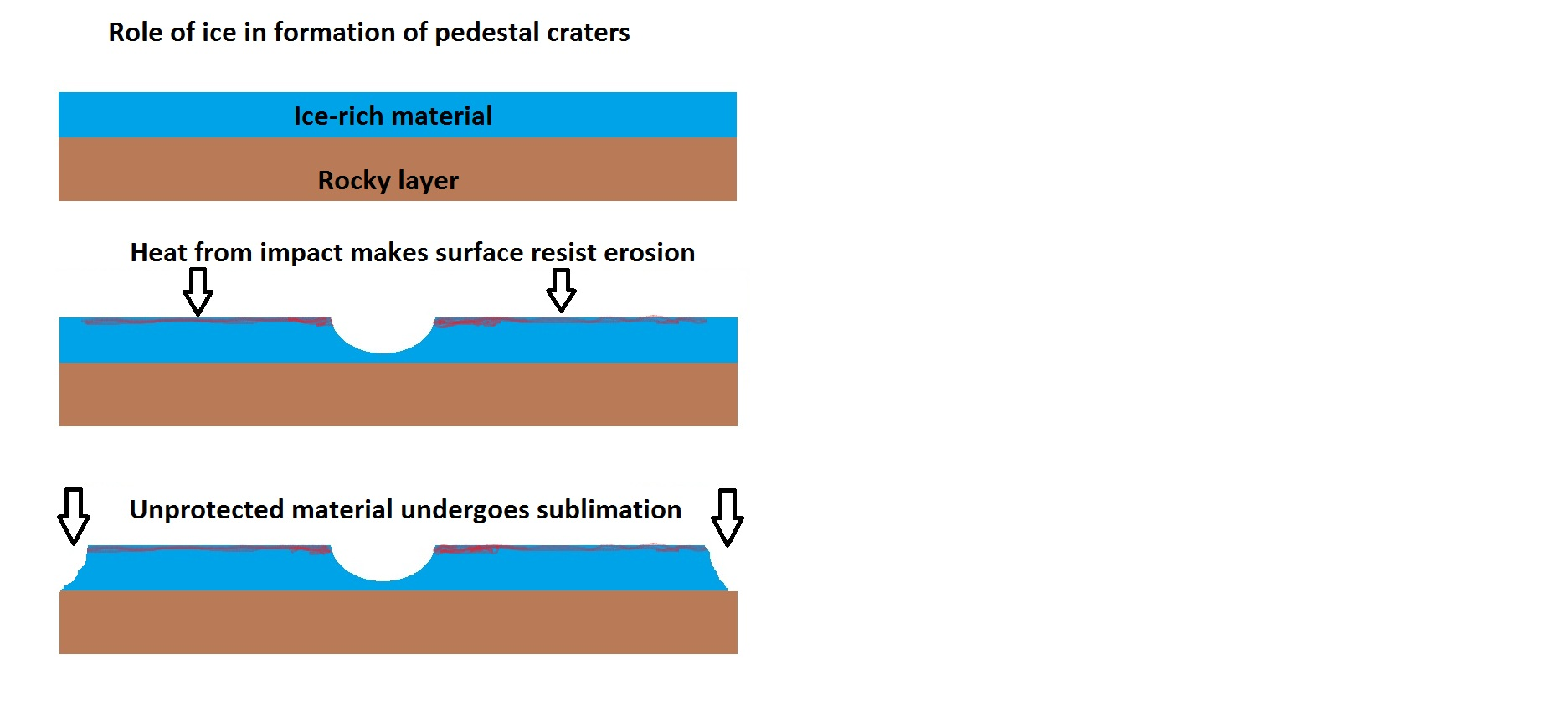
Drawing shows a later idea of how some pedestal craters form. In this way of thinking, an impacting projectile goes into an ice-rich layer—but no further. Heat and wind from the impact hardens the surface against erosion. This hardening can be accomplished by the melting of ice which produces a salt/mineral solution thereby cementing the surface.

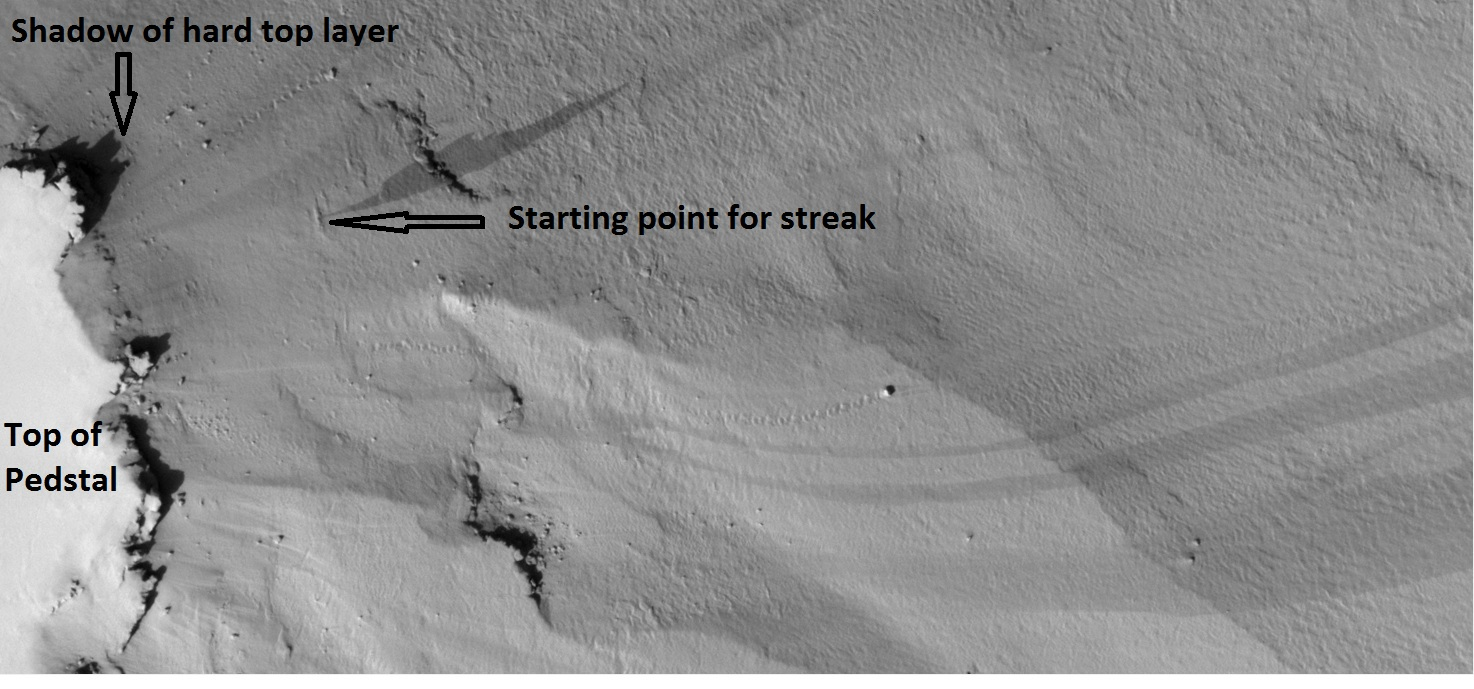
Dark slope streaks near the top of a pedestal crater, as seen by HiRISE under the HiWish program.

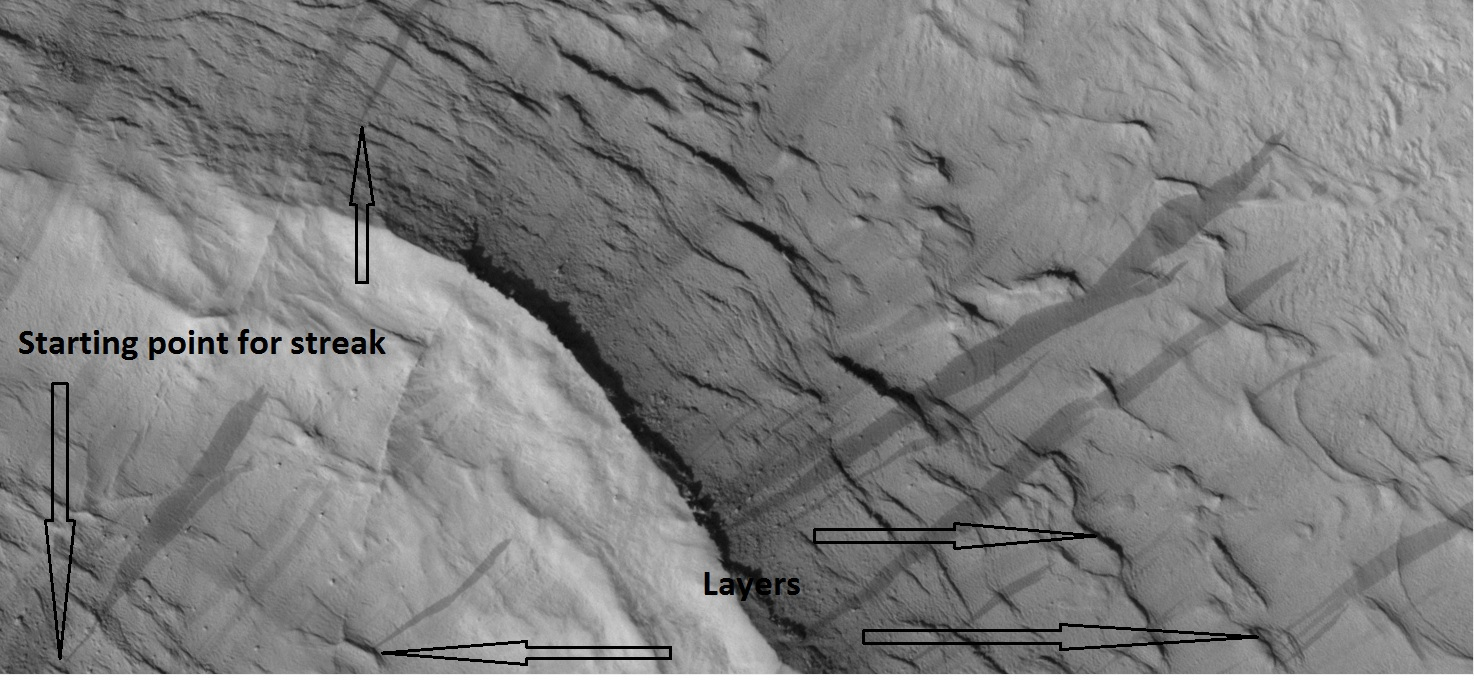
Dark slope streaks and layers near a pedestal crater, as seen by HiRISE under the HiWish program.

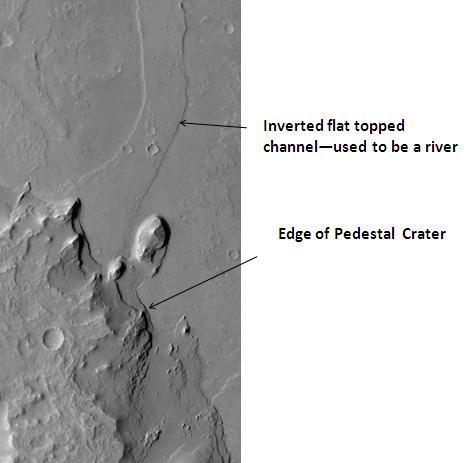
Pedestal Crater and ridge in Oxia Palus quadrangle, as seen by HiRISE. Click on image to see detail of the edge of the pedestal crater. The flat-topped ridge near the top of the image was once a river that became inverted. The pedestal crater superposes the ridge, so it is younger.

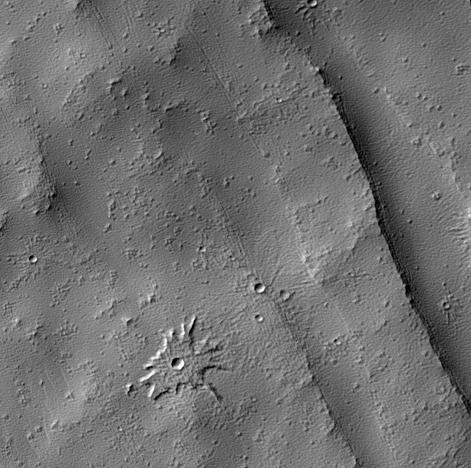
Biblis Patera Pedestal crater, as seen by HiRISE.
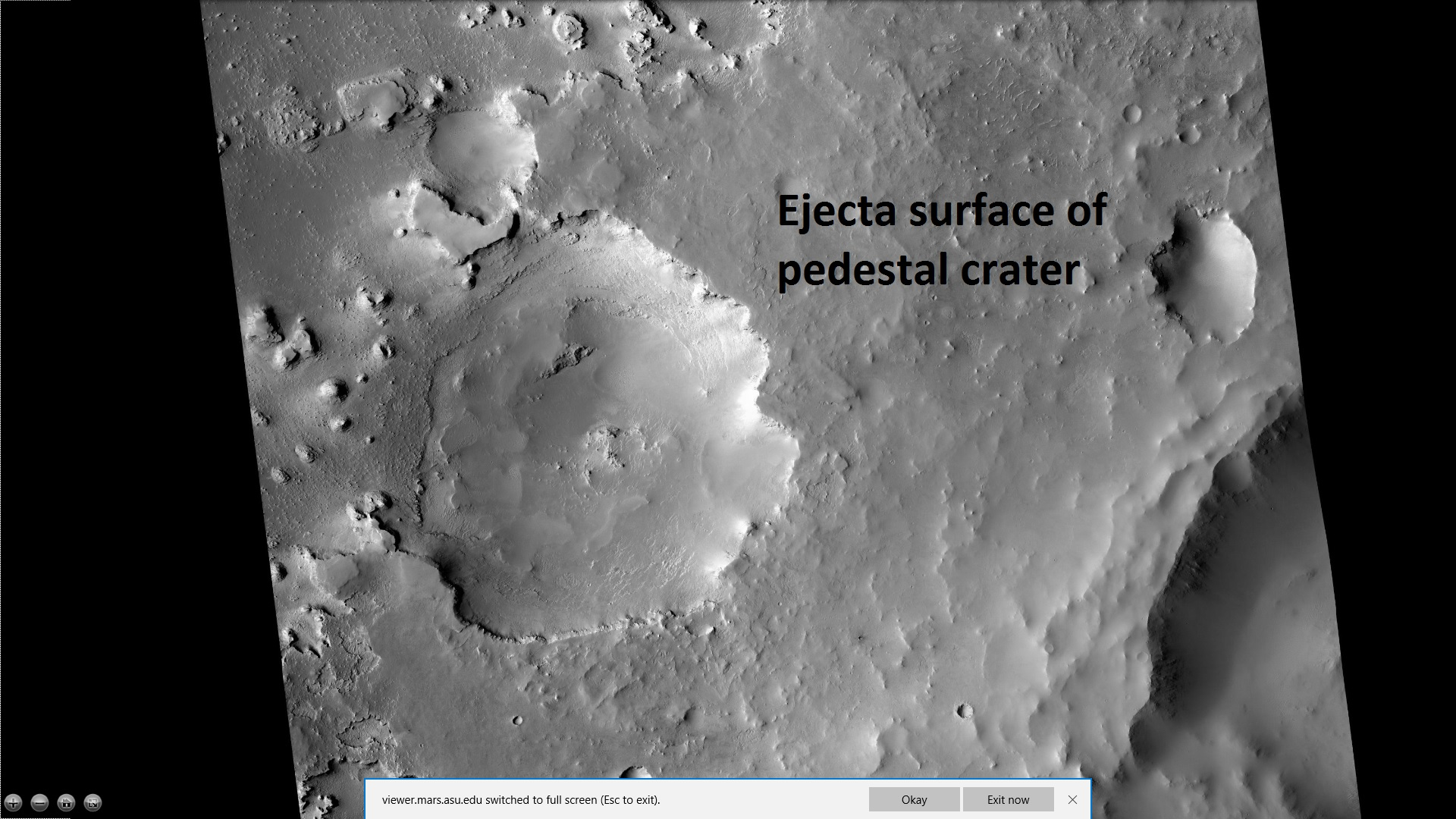
Wide CTX image of layers under the ejecta surface of a pedestal crater.

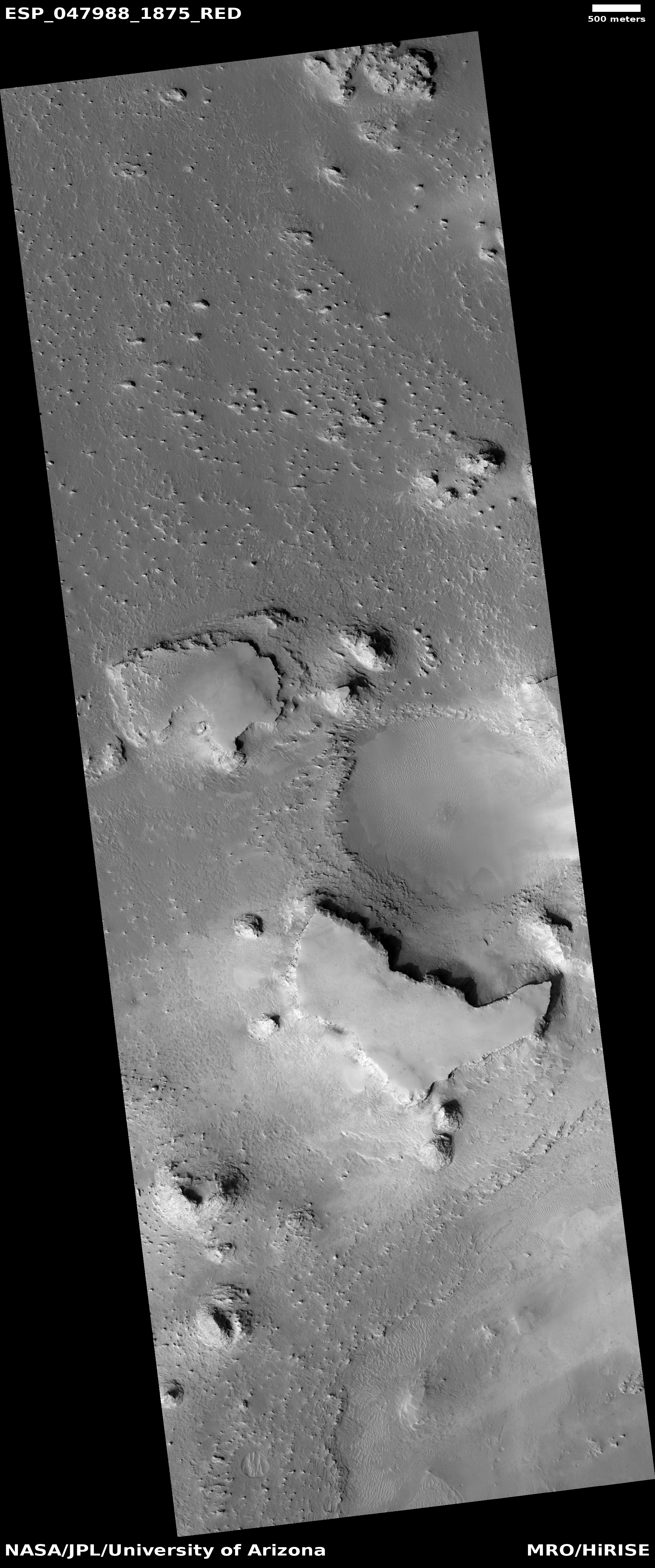
Layers under top layer of pedestal crater, as seen by HiRISE under HiWish program

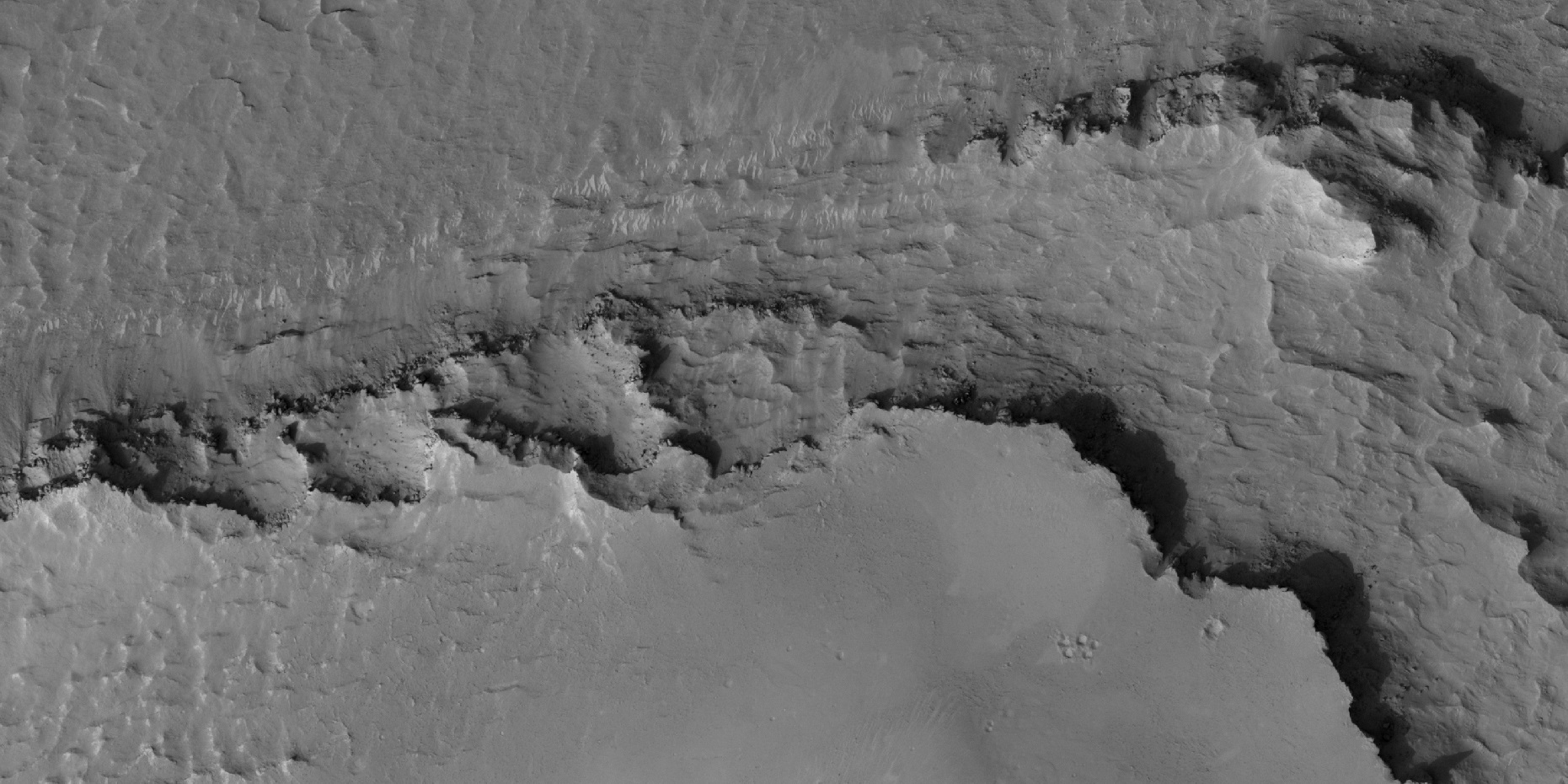
Close view of layers under ejecta surface of pedestal crater, as seen by HiRISE under HiWish program

== See also ==
- Geology of Mars
- Impact craters
- Impact event
- LARLE crater
- Martian Craters
- Rampart crater
