= List of geological features on Mimas =

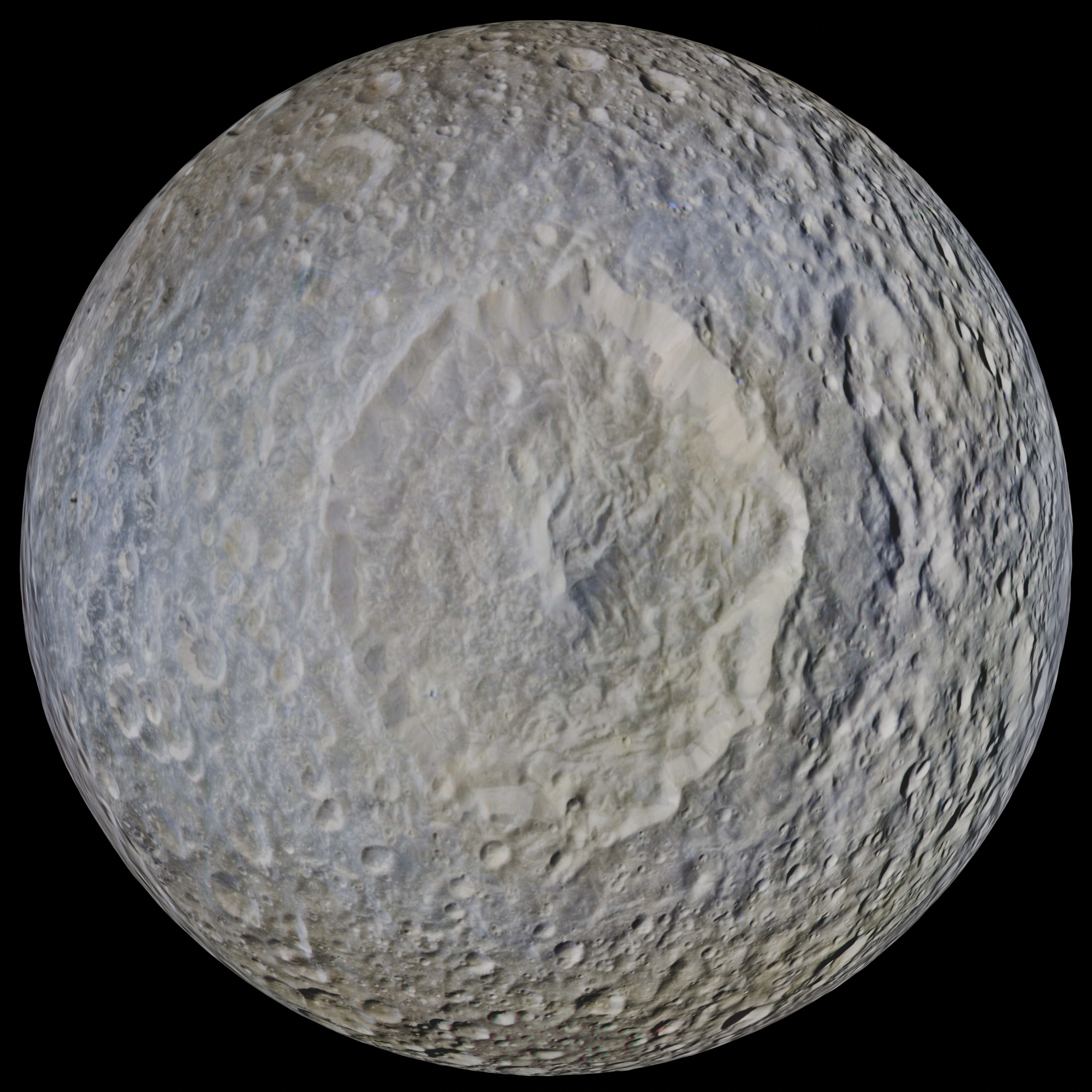
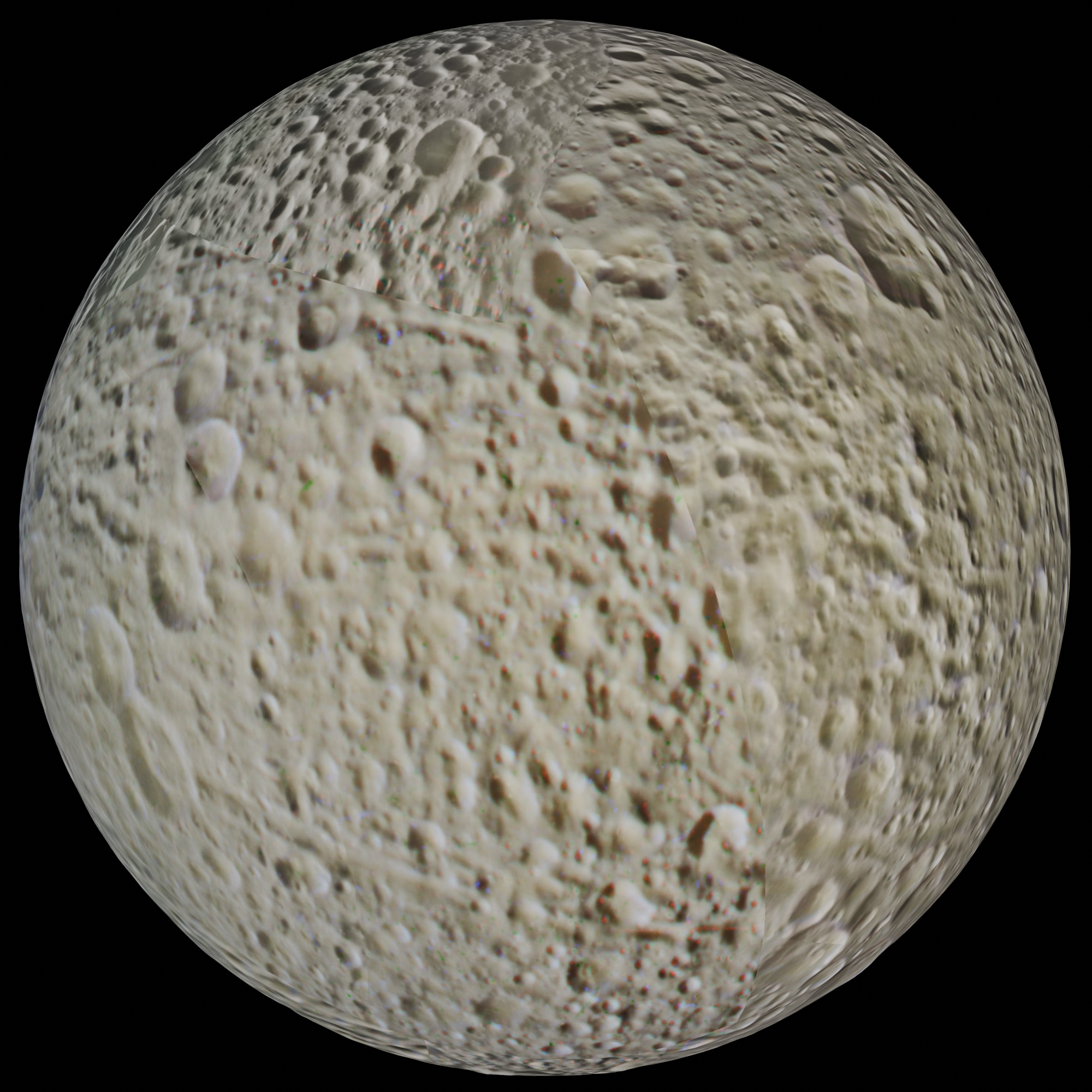

This is a list of named geological features on Mimas, a moon that orbits the planet Saturn. Mimantean features are named after people and places in Arthurian legend or the legends of the Titans. The sole exception to this is Herschel Crater, named after William Herschel, the astronomer who discovered Mimas in 1789. That name was chosen before the International Astronomical Union set a guideline for naming geological features on Mimas.

== Chasms ==
Mimas' chasmata are named after locations in Arthurian legend and the legends of the Titans.

Chasma	Named after	Pronounced
Avalon Chasma	Avalon	/ˈævəlɒn/
Camelot Chasma	Camelot	/ˈkæmɪlɒt/
Oeta Chasma	Oeta	/ˈiːtə/
Ossa Chasma	Ossa	/ˈɒsə/
Pangea Chasma	Pangea	/pænˈdʒiːə/
Pelion Chasma	Pelion	/ˈpiːliən/

== Craters ==
With the exception of Herschel, the craters of Mimas are named after characters in Arthurian legend.

Crater	Named after	Pronounced
Accolon	Accolon	/ˈækəlɒn/
Arthur	King Arthur	/ˈɑːrθər/
Balin	Sir Balin	/ˈbeɪlɪn/
Ban	King Ban	/ˈbæn/
Bedivere	Bedivere	/ˈbɛdɪvɪər/
Bors	Bors	/ˈbɔːrz/
Dagonet	Dagonet	/ˈdæɡənɛt/
Dynas	Dinas Emrys	
Elaine	Elaine	/ɪˈleɪn/
Gaheris	Gaheris	/ɡəˈhɛrɪs/
Galahad	Galahad	/ˈɡæləhæd/
Gareth	Gareth	/ˈɡærəθ/
Gawain	Gawain	/ɡəˈweɪn, ˈɡaʊən/
Gwynevere	Guinevere	/ˈɡwɪnɪvɪər/
Herschel	William Herschel	/ˈhɜːrʃəl/
Igraine	Igraine	/ɪˈɡreɪn/
Iseult	Iseult	/ɪˈsuːlt, ɪˈzuːlt/
Kay	Sir Kay	/ˈkeɪ/
Lamerok	Lamerok	/ˈlæmərək/
Launcelot	Launcelot	/ˈlɔːnsɪlɒt/
Lot	Lot	/ˈlɒt/
Lucas	Sir Lucan	/ˈluːkəs/
Marhaus	Morholt	/ˈmɑːrhaʊs/
Mark	Mark of Cornwall	/ˈmɑːrk/
Melyodas	Meliodas	/mɛliˈoʊdəs/
Merlin	Merlin	/ˈmɜːrlɪn/
Modred	Mordred	/ˈmoʊdrɛd/
Morgan	Morgan le Fay	/ˈmɔːrɡən/
Nero	Nero	/ˈnɪəroʊ/
Palomides	Palomides	/pæləˈmaɪdiːz/
Pellinore	Pellinore	/ˈpɛlɪnɔːr/
Percivale	Percivale	/ˈpɜːrsɪvəl/
Royns	Rience	/ˈrɔɪns/
Tristram	Tristram	/ˈtrɪstrəm/
Uther	Uther Pendragon	/ˈuːθər, ˈjuːθər/

== Crater chains ==
Mimas's sole named catena is named after a location in Arthurian legend.

Catena	Named after	Pronounced	Note
Tintagil Catena	Tintagel	/tɪnˈtædʒəl/	formerly Tintagil Chasma
