= Arthur (crater) =

Crater on Mimas, Saturn

- Feature type: Crater
- Location: Mimas, Saturn
- Coordinates: 35°24′S 196°02′W
- Diameter: 64 km (40 mi)
- Naming: 1982
- Eponym: King Arthur

Arthur is a crater on Mimas, a moon of Saturn. The crater was named after the King Arthur, the eponymous king of Arthurian Legend. The name "Arthur" was officially approved by the International Astronomical Union (IAU) in 1982.

== Geology and characteristics ==
Arthur is located at Mimas's Trailing hemisphere, with the coordinates of 35°24′S 196°02′W; and has a diameter of approximately 64 kilometres (40 mi) across the surface of Mimas. It is the second largest crater, after Herschel.
