= LARLE crater =

Class of Martian impact craters

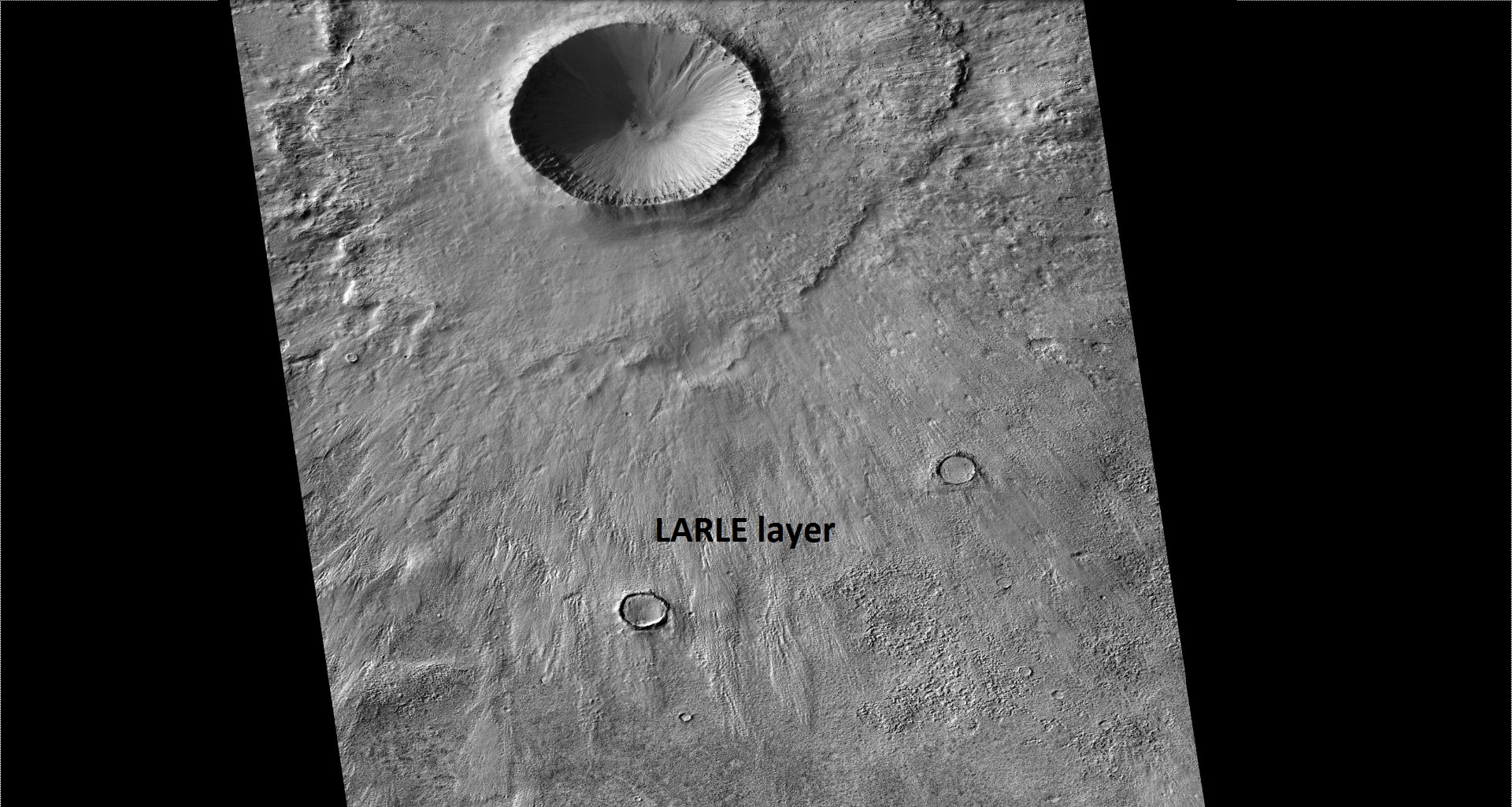
LARLE crater, as seen by CTX LARLE layer that is composed of fine-grained material is labeled. It may be eroded away and a pedestal crater will remain.

A low-aspect-ratio layered ejecta crater (LARLE crater) is a class of impact crater found on the planet Mars. This class of impact craters was discovered by Northern Arizona University scientist Professor Nadine Barlow and Dr. Joseph Boyce from the University of Hawaii in October 2013. Barlow described this class of craters as having a "thin-layered outer deposit" surpassing "the typical range of ejecta". "The combination helps vaporize the materials and create a base flow surge. The low aspect ratio refers to how thin the deposits are relative to the area they cover", Barlow said. The scientists used data from continuing reconnaissance of Mars using the old Mars Odyssey orbiter and the Mars Reconnaissance Orbiter. They discovered 139 LARLE craters ranging in diameter from 1.0 to 12.2 km, with 97% of the LARLE craters found poleward of 35N and 40S. The remaining 3% mainly traced in the equatorial Medusae Fossae Formation.

LARLE craters are characterized by a crater and normal layered ejecta pattern surrounded by an extensive but thin outer deposit which ends in a flame-like shape. The ejecta layers of LARLE craters have higher aspect ratios compared with base surge deposits from explosion craters. This difference is probably caused by large amounts of small particles of dust and ice in the areas where LARLE craters form. This ice and dust came from mantles of snow and dust that were deposited during the many climate changes in Martian history. After the impact, deposits are quickly stabilized (order of a few days to a few years) from eolian erosion by formation of a crust formed from diffusion of water vapor out of the deposits. LARLE craters may be useful as a marker of ice under the surface.

== Background ==
An impact crater is an approximately circular depression in the surface of a planet, moon or other solid body in the Solar System, formed by the hypervelocity impact of a smaller body with the surface. In contrast to volcanic craters, which result from explosion or internal collapse, impact craters typically have raised rims and floors that are lower in elevation than the surrounding terrain. Impact craters range from small, simple, bowl-shaped depressions to large, complex, multi-ringed impact basins. Meteor Crater is perhaps the best-known example of a small impact crater on the Earth.

Impact craters are not to be confused with landforms that in some cases appear similar, including calderas and ring dikes.

Impact craters are the dominant geographic features on many solid Solar System objects including the Moon, Mercury, Callisto, Ganymede and most small moons and asteroids. On other planets and moons that experience more active surface geological processes, such as Earth, Venus, Mars, Europa, Io and Titan, visible impact craters are less common because they become eroded, buried, or transformed by tectonics over time.

The cratering records of very old surfaces, such as Mercury, the Moon, and the southern highlands of Mars, record a period of intense early bombardment in the inner Solar System around 3.9 billion years ago. The cratering rate in the inner solar system fluctuates as a consequence of collisions in the asteroid belt that create a family of fragments that are often sent cascading into the inner solar system.

== Geological history of impact craters ==
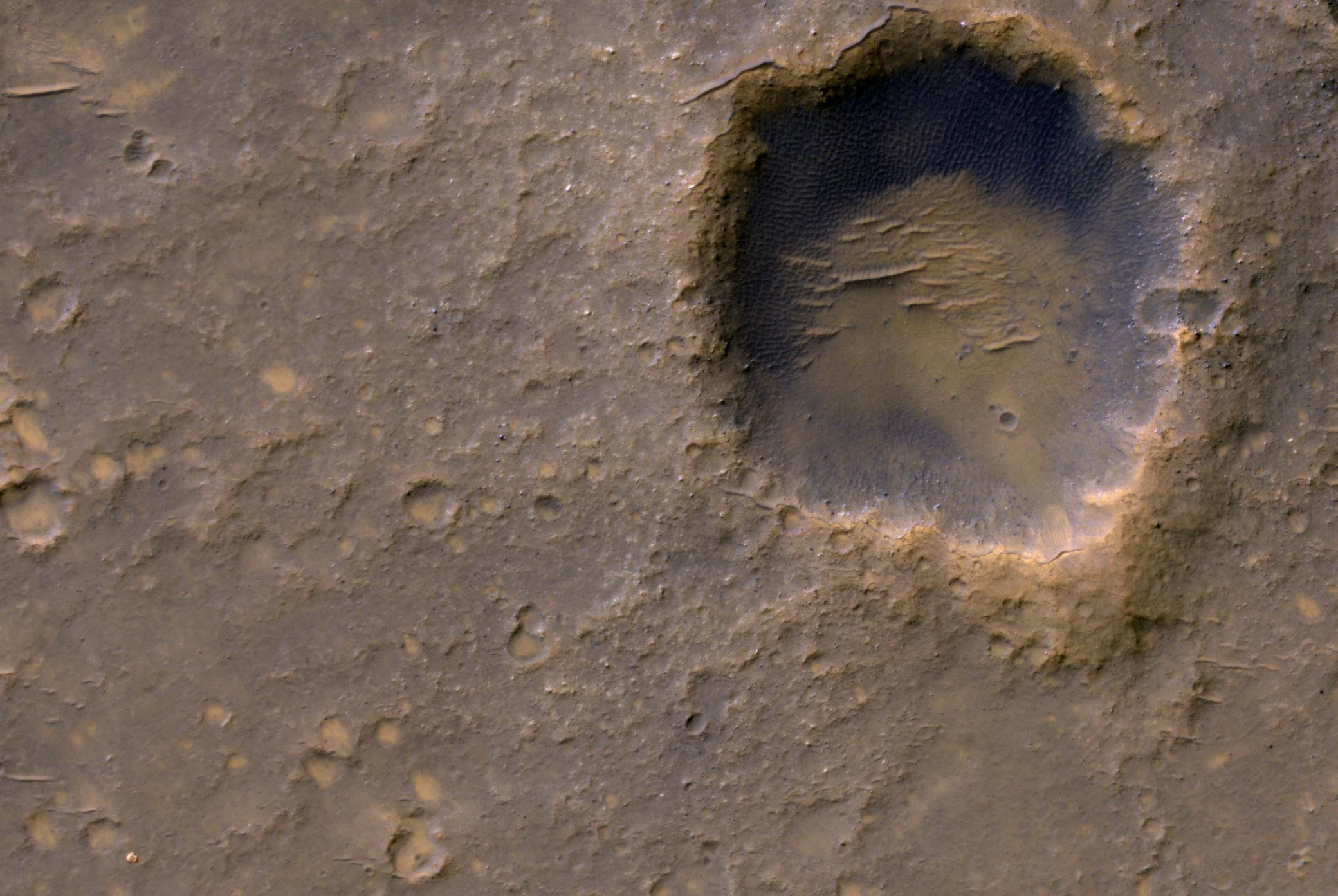
Bonneville crater and Spirit rover's lander

The geological history of Mars can be split into many periods, but the following are the three primary periods:

- Noachian period (named after Noachis Terra): Formation of the oldest extant surfaces of Mars, 4.5 billion years ago to 3.5 billion years ago. Noachian age surfaces are scarred by many large impact craters. The Tharsis bulge, a volcanic upland, is thought to have formed during this period, with extensive flooding by liquid water late in the period.
- Hesperian period (named after Hesperia Planum): 3.5 billion years ago to 2.9–3.3 billion years ago. The Hesperian period is marked by the formation of extensive lava plains.
- Amazonian period (named after Amazonis Planitia): 2.9–3.3 billion years ago to present. Amazonian regions have few meteorite impact craters, but are otherwise quite varied. Olympus Mons formed during this period, along with lava flows elsewhere on Mars.

== Martian impact craters ==
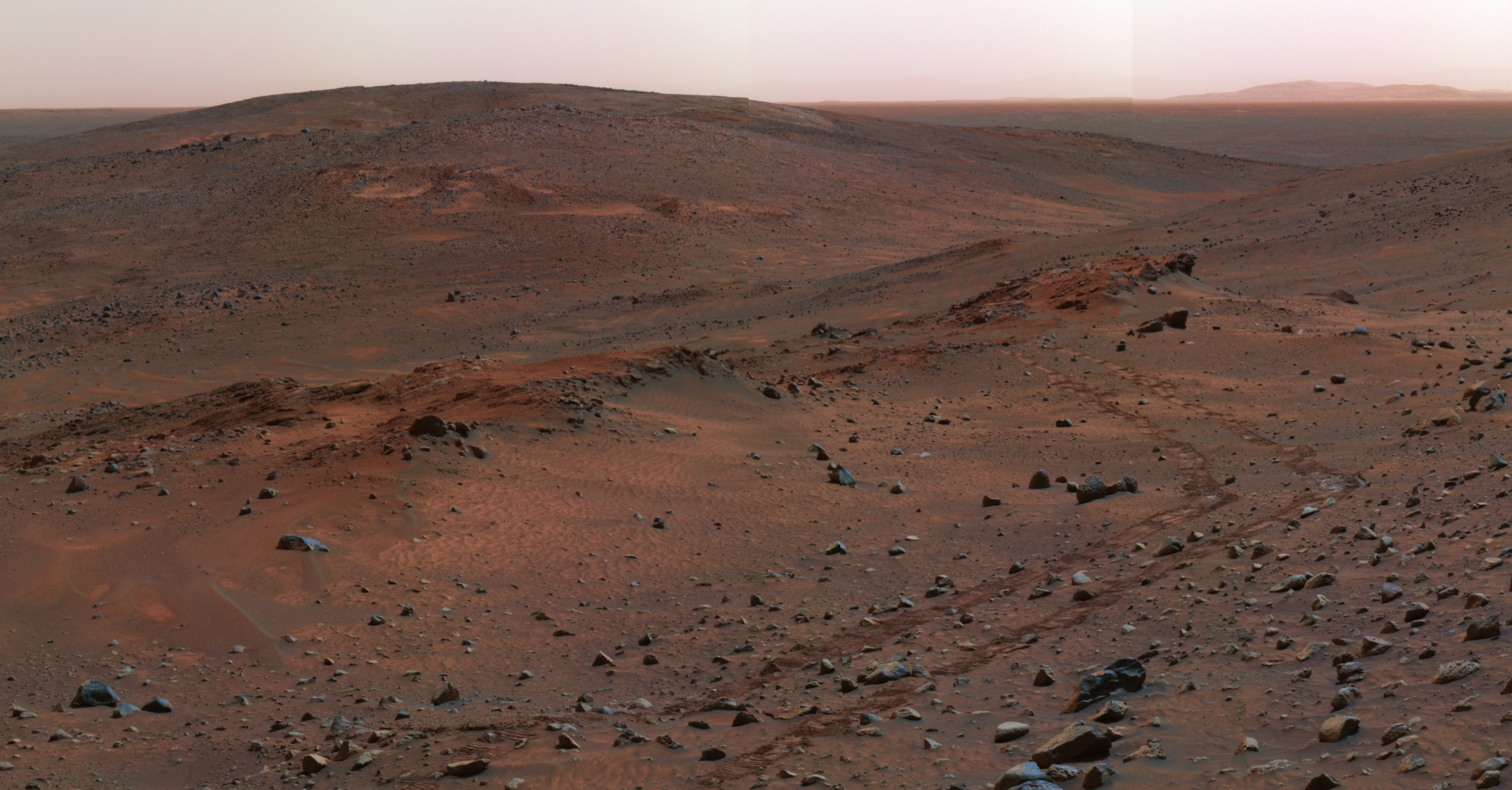
Panorama of Gusev crater, where Spirit rover examined volcanic basalts

The dichotomy of Martian topography is striking: northern plains flattened by lava flows contrast with the southern highlands, pitted and cratered by ancient impacts. Research in 2008 has presented evidence regarding a theory proposed in 1980 postulating that, four billion years ago, the northern hemisphere of Mars was struck by an object one-tenth to two-thirds the size of the Moon. If validated, this would make the northern hemisphere of Mars the site of an impact crater 10,600 km long by 8,500 km wide, or roughly the area of Europe, Asia, and Australia combined, surpassing the South Pole–Aitken basin as the largest impact crater in the Solar System.

Mars is scarred by a number of impact craters: a total of 43,000 craters with a diameter of 5 km or greater have been found. The largest confirmed of these is the Hellas impact basin, a light albedo feature clearly visible from Earth. Due to the smaller mass of Mars, the probability of an object colliding with the planet is about half that of the Earth. Mars is located closer to the asteroid belt, so it has an increased chance of being struck by materials from that source. Mars is also more likely to be struck by short-period comets, i.e. those that lie within the orbit of Jupiter. In spite of this, there are far fewer craters on Mars compared with the Moon, because the atmosphere of Mars provides protection against small meteors. Some craters have a morphology that suggests the ground became wet after the meteor impacted.

== Nomenclature of impact craters ==
Features on Mars are named from a variety of sources. Albedo features are named for classical mythology. Craters larger than 60 km are named for deceased scientists and writers and others who have contributed to the study of Mars. Craters smaller than 60 km are named for towns and villages of the world with populations of less than 100,000. Large valleys are named for the word "Mars" or "star" in various languages; small valleys are named for rivers.

== See also ==
- List of impact craters on Earth
- List of craters on Mercury
- List of craters on the Moon
- List of craters on Mars
- List of craters on Venus
- List of geological features on Phobos
- List of craters on Europa
- List of craters on Ganymede
- List of craters on Callisto
- List of geological features on Mimas
- List of geological features on Enceladus
- List of geological features on Tethys
- List of geological features on Dione
- List of geological features on Rhea
- List of geological features on Iapetus
- List of geological features on Puck
- List of geological features on Miranda
- List of geological features on Ariel
- List of craters on Umbriel
- List of geological features on Titania
- List of geological features on Oberon
- List of craters on Triton
