= Pharos (crater) =

Crater on Proteus

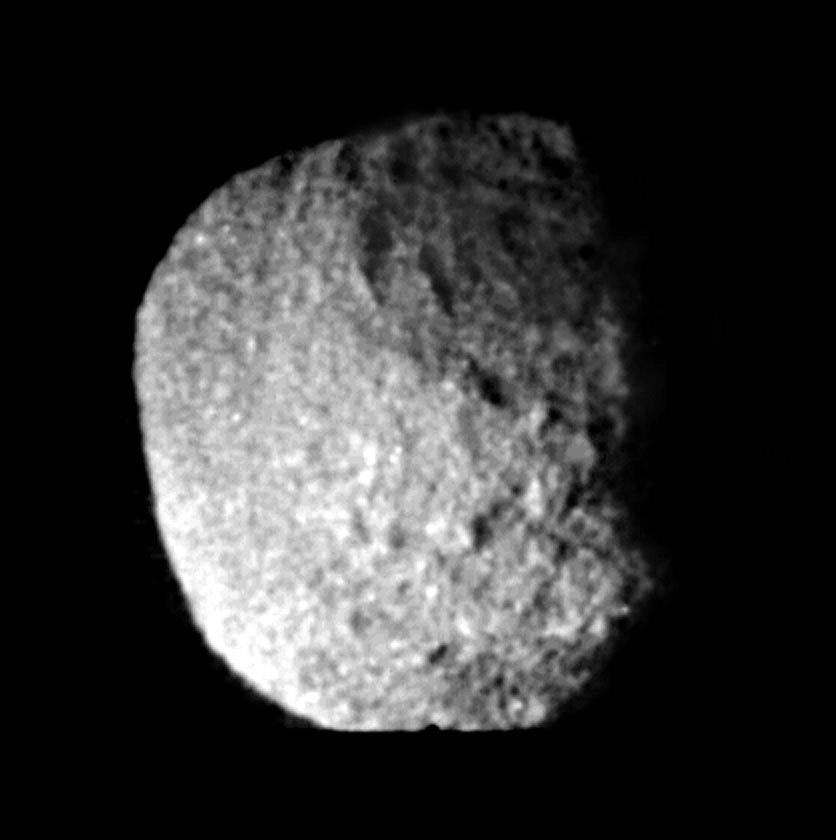
- A full-disc image of Proteus from the Voyager 2 spacecraft, with Pharos occupying much of the upper right
- Feature type: Impact crater Possible peak-ring impact basin
- Location: Proteus
- Coordinates: 10°0′S 10°0′W
- Diameter: 255±12 km (Croft 1992); 230 km (Stooke 1994)
- Depth: ~10 km (6.2 mi)
- Discoverer: Voyager 2
- Eponym: Island of Pharos

Pharos (/ˈfɛərɒs/ FAIR-oss) is the largest known impact crater on Neptune's moon Proteus. It is named after the island of Pharos, and is the only named surface feature on Proteus as of 2026. It is a degraded feature measuring 10–15 kilometres (6.2–9.3 mi) deep with a diameter of around 250 km (160 mi), making it more than half the diameter of Proteus itself. Debris ejected from its formative impact event may have formed Hippocamp, a small moon whose orbit is unusually close to Proteus's.

== Observation and naming ==
Pharos was first discovered in the Voyager 2 spacecraft's flyby of Neptune and its system of moons on 25 August 1989, being one of the first identifiable features on Proteus. The discovery of Proteus (then provisionally designated S/1989 N 1) itself was announced roughly two months prior on 7 July 1989 as Voyager 2 approached the Neptune system. The impact basin was provisionally named in a 1992 paper by Steven K. Croft after the island of Pharos, whose only surviving remnant is the Ras el-Tin promontory in modern-day Alexandria, Egypt. The name was officially approved by the International Astronomical Union (IAU) in 1994.

== Geology ==
With a diameter between 230 and 267 kilometres (143 and 166 mi), (Note: Diameter calculated as 255±12 km by Steven K. Croft in 1992 and interpreted as "approximately 230 km" by Philip J. Stooke in 1994.) Pharos is by far the largest known impact structure on Proteus. As Proteus's mean radius is ~210 ± 7 km (130.5 ± 4.3 mi), this makes Pharos over half the size of the satellite itself. The impact basin is so large that it significantly affects Proteus's overall shape, appearing as if a facet has been carved from its limb. Pharos is a relatively degraded crater, bound by an outer incomplete scarp interrupted by subsequent impacts. The floor of Pharos appears to be domed, but nevertheless lacks a clear central peak that characterizes central-peak impact craters. However, there may be a peak ring structure with a diameter approximately half that of Pharos's outer rim. A series of depressions further surround Pharos, with a system of north-south oriented valleys bordering the southeast rim being the most prominent. Furthermore, a ridge appears to run parallel to the northeastern rim. The origins of these structures are unknown, though they may represent an even larger outer ring of Pharos, bringing Pharos's total diameter to between 500 and 550 km (310 and 340 mi)—significantly larger than Proteus's mean diameter. Imagery and shape models derived from Voyager 2 data are not adequate to confirm this interpretation.

Despite the relatively poor image resolution of Voyager 2, several structures have been identified within Pharos. The most prominent are numerous smaller impact craters, the largest of which is roughly 100 km (62 mi) in diameter and occupies the southwestern floor of Pharos (located at roughly 40° S, 20° W). The northern floor contains a dome or hill-like structure roughly 20 km (12 mi) wide (located at roughly 5° S, 0° E); its origins are unknown, though a volcanic origin is unlikely due to Proteus's small size and geological history. Much of Pharos's western floor is occupied by a broad, well-defined winding valley that resembles a graben. The valley is roughly 12 km (7.5 mi) across and at least 100 km long, cutting across the northern rim of the 100 km crater. As the valley appears to extend along the terminator in Voyager 2 imagery, it may continue further north. Imagery also indicates that the surface of Pharos's interior may be darker than the surrounding terrain, though this remains uncertain.

Given Pharos's large size relative to Proteus itself, the impact event that created Pharos was likely highly disruptive. Nevertheless, that Pharos's structure is identifiable indicates that Proteus was not brought "to the brink" of destruction. Instead, Pharos's large size points towards Proteus's surface nearly being brought to the point of significant resurfacing. A system of possible tectonic faults and fractures oriented concentrically around Pharos may be related to stresses from the Pharos impact event. Additional linear features oriented radially from Pharos may exist, although S. K. Croft cautions that the features could be an illusory artifact of illumination. Alternatively, the extensive fracturing on Proteus may be the result of partial relaxation of Pharos, or tidal stresses from the reorientation of Proteus due to the Pharos impact.

=== Effect on other Neptunian moons ===
The Pharos impact would have also excavated large amounts of debris and ejecta, much of which would have escaped into direct Neptune orbit. The debris may have formed a dusty ring around Neptune in Proteus's orbit, similar to the gossamer rings of Jupiter's inner moons. Such a ring could potentially survive to the present day. Fragments over 500 metres (1,600 feet) in diameter were ejected at velocities greater than 1.7 km/s (3,800 mph), enough to reach Triton's orbit. The fragments would impact at velocities of roughly 7.5 km/s (17,000 mph) relative to Triton, enough to excavate craters 7 kilometres (4.3 miles) in diameter. However, due to Pharos's ancient age and Triton's very rapid rate of resurfacing, it is unlikely any of Triton's observed craters are due to the Pharos impact. Some of the escaped ejecta may have also accreted into the neighboring moon Hippocamp, whose volume is only roughly 2% of the estimated total volume of the Pharos basin. However, this model is uncertain and has several complications; if Hippocamp was created from debris ejected from the Pharos impact, then Proteus would have subsequently strongly excited Hippocamp's orbital eccentricity and inclination. Hippocamp's eccentricity and inclination are both small, so if Hippocamp originated from the Pharos impact a mechanism is required to circularize Hippocamp's orbit. Nevertheless, Hippocamp's origin remains uncertain, and it may have formed independently, unrelated to Proteus and the Pharos basin. Assuming an origin from impact debris ejected from Proteus, as large impacts were more common early in the Solar System's history, Hippocamp is likely several billion years old.

== See also ==
- Herschel – A similarly-sized impact crater on Saturn's moon Mimas
- Rheasilvia – A large impact basin that significantly altered the asteroid Vesta's shape
