= Albert Cossery =

Egyptian-born French writer with Syrian parents from Homs, Al Qusair

- Taken by the painter, Pedro Uhart at the Hôtel La Louisiane Paris
- Born: 3 November 1913; Cairo, Egypt
- Died: 22 June 2008 (aged 94); Paris, France
- Occupation: Writer
- Writing career
- Language: French

Albert Cossery (3 November 1913 – 22 June 2008) was an Egyptian-born French writer. Although Cossery lived most of his life in Paris and only wrote in the French language, all of his novels were either set in his country of birth, Egypt, or in an imaginary Middle Eastern country. He was nicknamed "The Voltaire of the Nile". His writings pay tribute to the humble and to the misfits of his childhood in Cairo, as well as praise a form of laziness and simplicity very distant from our contemporary society.

Albert Cossery was well known in Saint-Germain-des-Prés, where he lived in the same hotel, Hotel La Louisiane, since 1945.

== Life ==
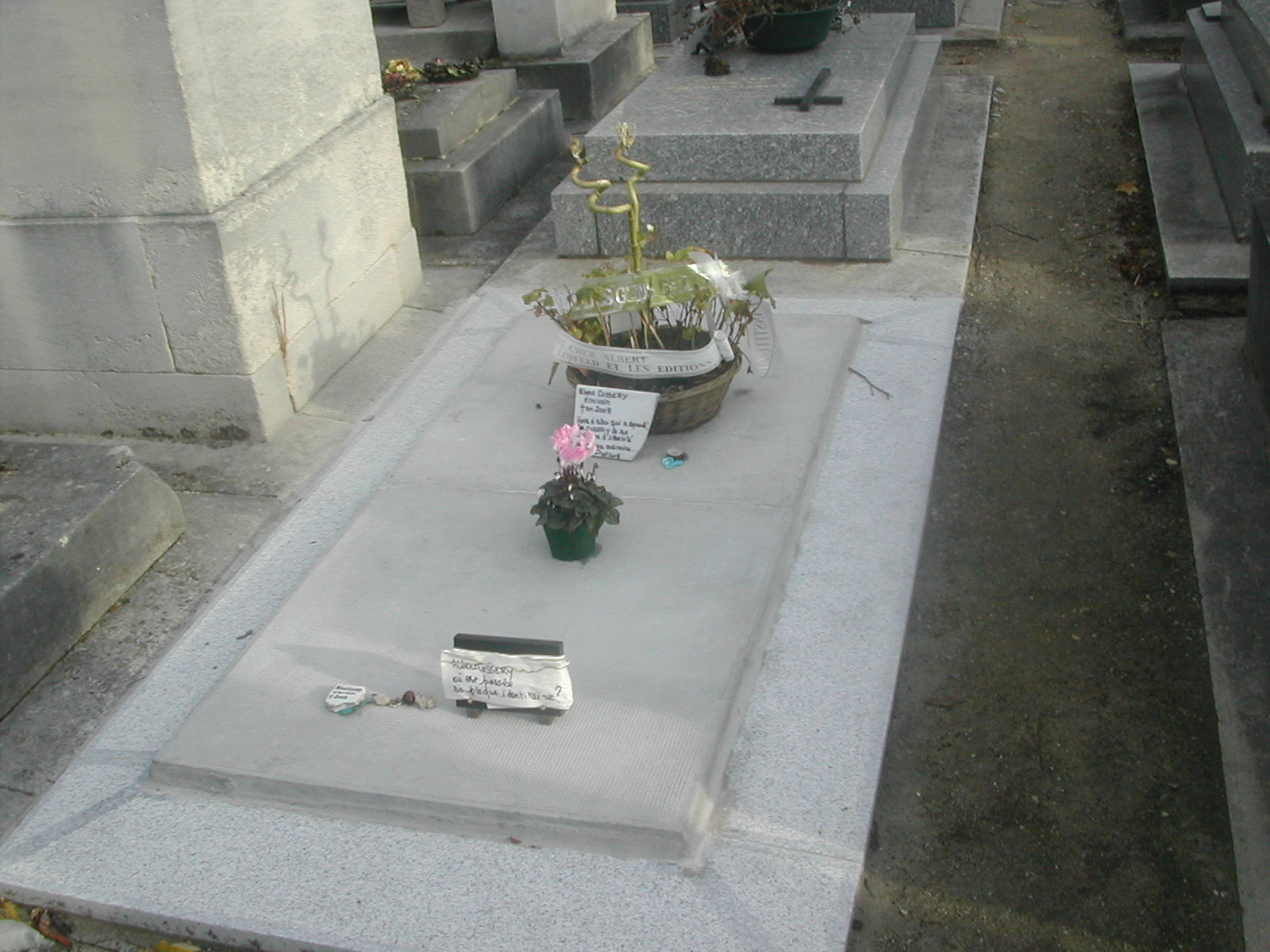
Cossery's tomb at Montparnasse

Albert Cossery (Arabic: البرت قصيري) was born in Cairo to a Greek Orthodox Christian family of Syrian descent, specifically from al-Qusayr. His parents were wealthy small-property owners that originally owned land in Damietta. In a conversation with Lebanese writer Abdallah Naaman in 1998, Cossery said, "We are the "Shawams" (Levantines, referring to the Bilad al-Sham) of Egypt. My father is a Greek Orthodox native of the village of al-Qusayr, near Homs, in Syria. Upon arriving in Cairo at the end of the 19th century, the family adopted "Cossery" (after al-Qusayr) as their family name due to its simplified pronunciation." The Cossery family, as well as all of the elites living in Egypt during this era, were well steeped in French culture. At the age of 17, inspired by reading Honoré de Balzac, he emigrated to Paris to continue studies that he never completed, writing and settling permanently in the French capital in 1945, where he lived until his death in 2008.

In 60 years he only wrote eight novels, in accordance with his philosophy of life in which "laziness" is not a vice but a form of contemplation and meditation. In his own words: "So much beauty in the world, so few eyes to see it." At the age of 27 he published his first book, Les hommes oubliés de Dieu ("Men God Forgot"). During his literary career he became a close friend of other writers and artists such as Lawrence Durrell, Albert Camus, Jean Genet and Giacometti.

Cossery died on 22 June 2008, aged 94.

His books, which always take place in Egypt or other Arab countries, portray the contrast between poverty and wealth, the powerful and the powerless, in a witty although dramatic way. His writing mocks vanity and the narrowness of materialism and his principal characters are mainly vagrants, thieves or dandies that subvert the order of an unfair society. His novels often feature auto-biographical characters, like Teymour, the hero of the novel Un complot de saltimbanques, a young man who forges a diploma in chemical engineering after a life of enjoyment and lust abroad instead of study and gets back to his home town and enters into an unexpected intringue against the authorities with his dandy friends. He is considered by some to be the last genuine "anarchist" or free thinking writer of western culture by his humorous and provocative although lucid and profound view of human relations and society. His writing style does not submit to an academic or experimental approach which makes him a vivid, catchy storyteller, without the boredom nor artificial ambiguity of some classical (which he is) or avantgarde writers. The sageness of his works are monuments to the freedom of being and thought against materialism, the contemporary obsession with consumption and productivity, the arrogance and abuse of authority, the vanity of social formalities and the injustice of the wealthy towards the poor.

In 1990 Cossery was awarded the Grand prix de la francophonie of the Académie française and in 2005 the Grand Prix Poncetton de la SGDL.

The first of his books translated in English are Men God Forgot (first translated by Harold Edwards of Faruk University, Alexandria, Egypt, not by Henry Miller, whose note on Cossery appeared on a later 1963 City Lights Books edition, and published in the United States in 1946 by George Leite's Circle Editions of Berkeley), The House of Certain Death (New Directions, 1949), The Lazy Ones (New Directions, 1952), and Proud Beggars (Black Sparrow Press, 1981).

Three more of Cossery's novels have since been published in English translation: Anna Moschovakis' The Jokers (NYRB Classics) and Alyson Waters' A Splendid Conspiracy and The Colors of Infamy (New Directions). As of 2014, Une ambition dans le désert remains untranslated into English.

== Works ==
- Les Hommes oubliés de Dieu (1940)
  - Men God Forgot, translation by Harold Edwards (Circle Edition, 1946)
- La Maison de la mort certaine (1944)
  - The House of Certain Death, translation by Stuart B. Kaiser (New Directions Publishing, 1949)
- Les Fainéants dans la vallée fertile (1948)
  - Laziness in the Fertile Valley, translation by William Goyen (New Directions Publishing, 1953)
- Mendiants et Orgueilleux (1955)
  - Proud Beggars, translation by Thomas W. Cushing (Black Sparrow Press, 1981), revised by Alyson Waters (New York Review Books, 2011)
- La Violence et la Dérision (1964)
  - Violence and Derision, also called The Jokers, translation by Anna Moschovakis (New York Review Books, 2010)
- Un complot de saltimbanques (1975)
  - A Splendid Conspiracy, translation by Alyson Waters (New Directions Publishing, 2010)
- Une ambition dans le désert (1984)
  - An Ambition in the Desert
- Les Couleurs de l'infamie (1999)
  - The Colors of Infamy, translation by Alyson Waters (New Directions Publishing, 2011)

== Films ==
- In 1978 Les fainéants dans la vallée fertile was made into a film by the Greek director Nikos Panagiotopoulos. (First Prize at the Locarno Film Festival. Second Prize at the Chicago Film Festival). ()
- Beggars and Noblemen (1991) and The Jokers (2004) were made into movies by the female Egyptian film director Asmaa El-Bakry.
- Cossery was the screenwriter for Les Guichets du Louvre.

== Bibliography ==
- Conversation avec Albert Cossery ( Michel Mitrani ) 1995 - Joelle Losfeld
- L'Egypte d'Albert Cossery 2001 - Joelle Losfeld
- Le Magazine littéraire Novembre 2005 - Propos recueillis par Aliette Armel
- egyptiansurrealism.com
