= Herschel (Mimantean crater) =

Crater on Mimas

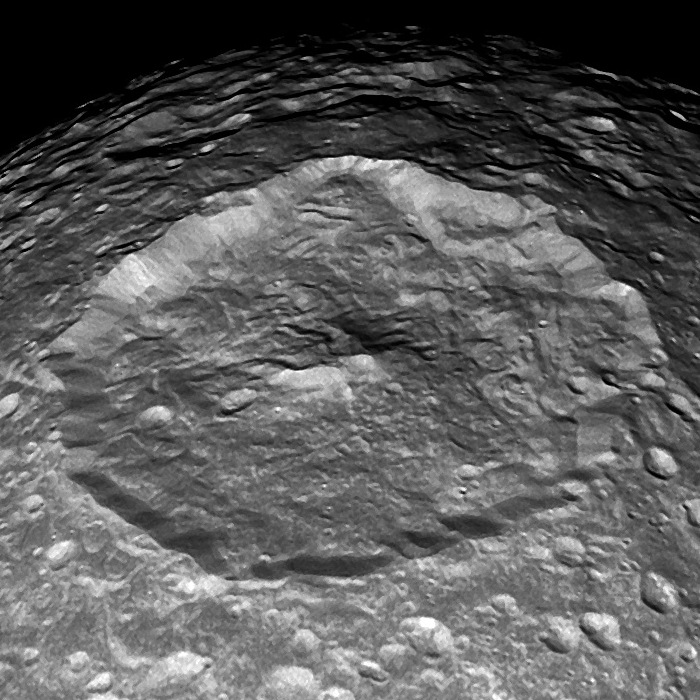
- An angled view of Herschel from Cassini
- Feature type: Central peak impact basin
- Location: Leading hemisphere, Mimas
- Coordinates: 1.38°S 111.76°W
- Diameter: c. 139 km (86 mi)
- Depth: c. 10–12 km (6.2–7.5 mi)
- Impactor diameter: 4.8 kilometers (3 mi)
- Age: c. 4.1 billion years
- Discoverer: Voyager 1 in 1980
- Eponym: William Herschel

Herschel (/ˈhɜːrʃəl/) is the largest impact crater on Saturn's moon Mimas. It is located on Mimas's leading hemisphere, centered on the equator at 112° longitude. It is named after the 18th-century astronomer William Herschel, who discovered Mimas in 1789.

== Geology ==
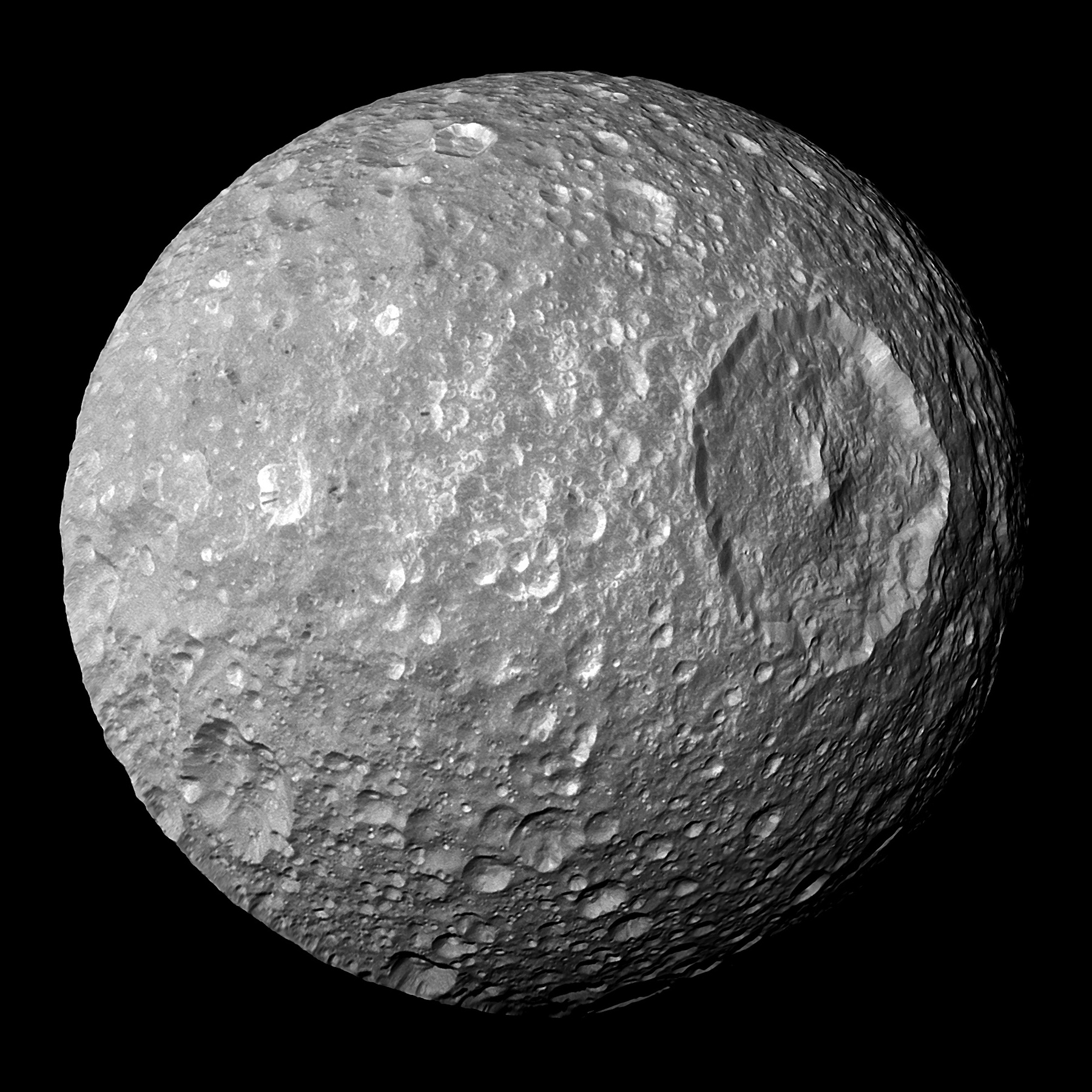
Herschel on Mimas, as imaged by Cassini

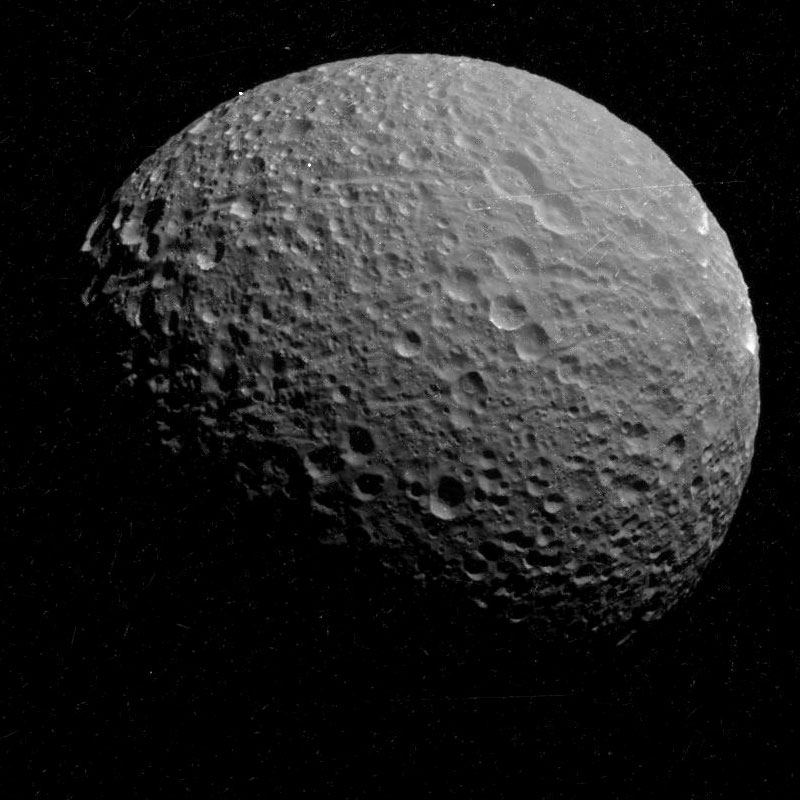
The antipode of Herschel, with fractures (chasmata) possibly caused by Herschel's creation. Near the top, Ossa Chasma runs left of the double crater Gwynevere (upper left) and Launcelot.

Herschel is the second-largest crater relative to its parent body of any equilibrium planetary moon in the Solar System after Tethys's crater Odysseus. It is so large that astronomers have expressed surprise that Mimas was not shattered by the impact that caused it. It measures 139 kilometres (86 miles) across, almost one third the diameter of Mimas. Its walls are approximately 5 km (3 mi) high, parts of its floor are 10–12 km (6–7 mi) deep, and its central peak rises 6–8 km (3 1/2–5 mi) above the crater floor.

=== Origin ===
The impact that formed Herschel must have nearly disrupted Mimas entirely. Large chasms (termed chasmata) that may be stress fractures due to shock waves from the impact traveling through it and focusing there can be seen on the opposite side of Mimas. The impact is also suspected of having something to do with the current "Pac-Man"–shaped temperature pattern on Mimas. Herschel has an estimated age of around 4.1 billion years. it is also estimated that the impactor had a mean diameter of 4.8 kilometers (3 mi), and had a speed of 15 km/s.

== Media reception ==
The similarity between Mimas's appearance and the Death Star in Star Wars: Episode 4 due to the large size of Herschel has often been noted, both in the press and in NASA/JPL press releases. This is a coincidence, however, as the crater's similarities were not discovered until 1980 when Voyager 1 gained line of sight, three years after the movie was made.

== See also ==
- Pharos – a similarly sized crater on Proteus
- List of largest craters in the Solar System
- List of tallest mountains in the Solar System
