= Hippocamp (moon) =

Small moon of Neptune

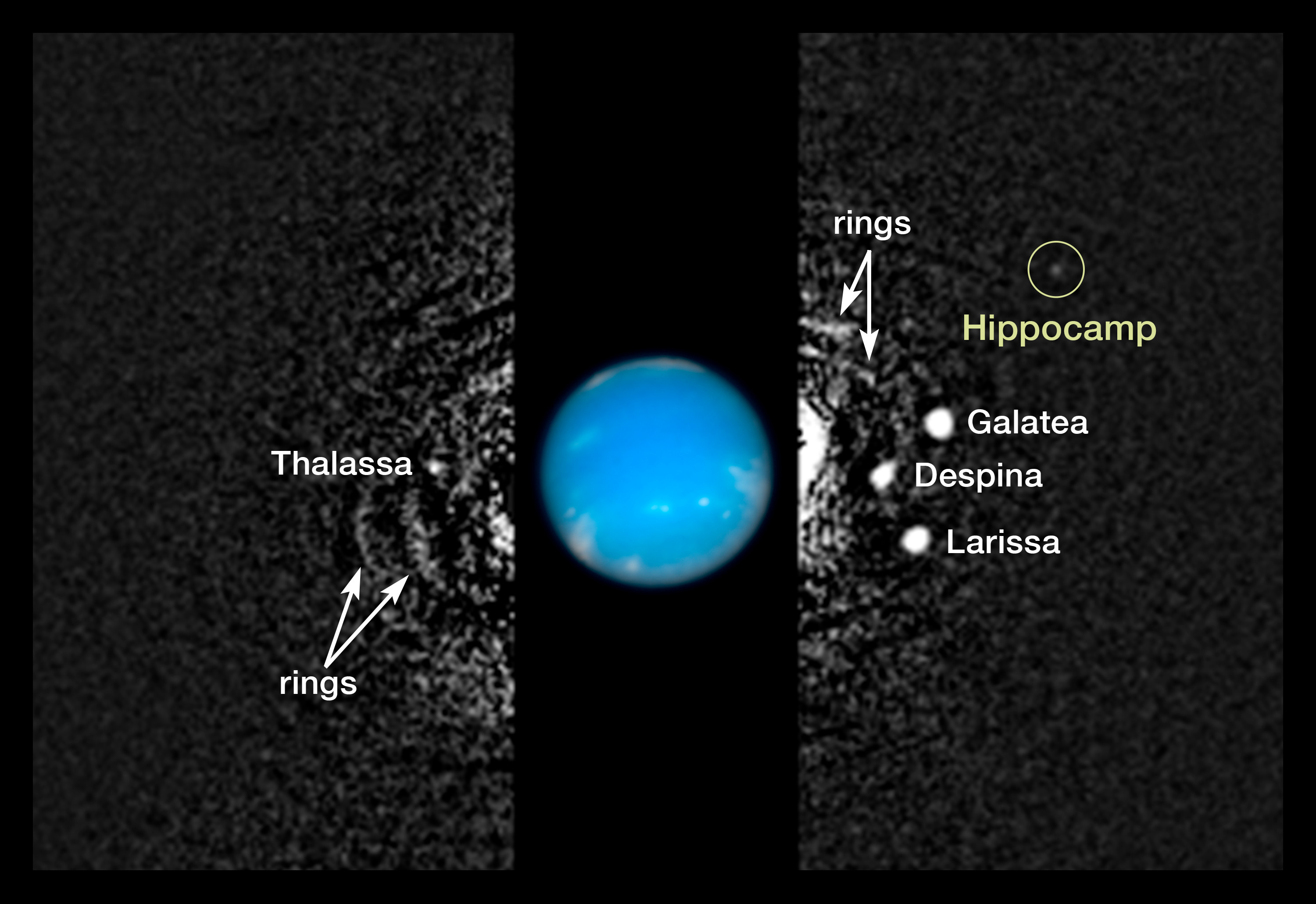
- Composite of Hubble images from 2009 showing Neptune, its rings, and inner moons including Hippocamp (circled) (Note: The relative brightness of the moons is exaggerated in this composite of high and low exposure images. The color image of Neptune was taken separately by Hubble in August 2009.)

Discovery
- Discovered by: M. R. Showalter; I. de Pater; J. J. Lissauer; R. S. French
- Discovery date: 1 July 2013

Designations
- Designation: Neptune XIV
- Pronunciation: /ˈhɪpəkæmp/
- Named after: ἱππόκαμπος hippokampos
- Alternative names: S/2004 N 1
- Adjectives: Hippocampian /hɪpəˈkæmpiən/

Orbital characteristics
- Epoch 1 January 2020 (JD 2458849.5)
- Earliest precovery date: 6 November 2004
- Semi-major axis: 105,283 km
- Eccentricity: 0.00001
- Orbital period (sidereal): 0.95 d (22.8 h)
- Mean anomaly: 329.901°
- Mean motion: 378.906°/d
- Inclination: 0.002° (to local Laplace plane)
- Longitude of ascending node: 110.467°
- Argument of perihelion: 305.446°
- Satellite of: Neptune

Physical characteristics
- Mean radius: 17.4±2.0 km
- Mass: (1.029–30.87)×10^{15} kg (Note: Mass range for assumed densities of 0.05–1.50 g/cm^{3}.)
- Synodic rotation period: synchronous (assumed)
- Albedo: 0.09±0.01 (assumed)
- Apparent magnitude: 26.5±0.3

Hippocamp, also designated Neptune XIV, is a small inner moon of Neptune discovered on 1 July 2013. It was found by astronomer Mark Showalter by analyzing archived Neptune photographs the Hubble Space Telescope captured between 2004 and 2009. The moon is so dim that it was not observed when the Voyager 2 space probe flew by Neptune and its moons in 1989. It is about 35 km (20 mi) in diameter, and orbits Neptune in about 23 hours, just under one Earth day. Due to its unusually close distance to Neptune's largest inner moon Proteus, it has been hypothesized that Hippocamp may have accreted from material ejected by an impact on Proteus several billion years ago. The moon was previously known by its provisional designation S/2004 N 1 until it was officially named Hippocamp in February 2019, after the mythological sea-horse symbolizing Poseidon in Greek mythology.

== History ==
=== Discovery ===
Hippocamp was discovered by a team of astronomers led by Mark Showalter of the SETI Institute on 1 July 2013. Showalter was examining archival Hubble Space Telescope images of Neptune from 2009, as part of his study on the ring arcs of Neptune. Since the inner moons and ring arcs of Neptune orbit quickly, Showalter developed and used a technique similar to panning, where multiple short-exposure images are gathered and digitally warped to compensate for orbital motion and to allow stacking of multiple images to bring out faint details. On a whim, Showalter decided to extend his analysis to regions beyond Neptune's ring system; he then found Hippocamp as a faint but unambiguous white dot.

To confirm the moon, Showalter further analyzed over 150 archival Hubble images going back to 2004. Within a week, Showalter repeatedly found Hippocamp in these images and was able to identify the moon at ten different observation times from 2004 to 2009. Showalter had also checked images from the Voyager 2 spacecraft to find any detections of Hippocamp during its 1989 Neptune flyby, but was unable to identify the moon since it was too dim to be detected by Voyager 2's cameras. Nonetheless, the number of archival Hubble images with Hippocamp was enough to determine the moon's orbit. The discovery of Hippocamp was formally announced in a notice issued by the International Astronomical Union's Central Bureau for Astronomical Telegrams, along with a press release by the Space Telescope Science Institute on 15 July 2013. Given that the relevant images examined by Showalter were available to the public, the discovery could have been made by anyone.

=== Naming ===
The moon is named after the hippocampus, a mythological creature depicted as having the upper body of a horse with the lower body of a fish in Greek mythology. The hippocampus symbolizes the Greek sea god Poseidon as well as the Roman sea god Neptune. In Roman mythology, Neptune would often drive a sea-chariot pulled by hippocampi.

The moon was given the provisional designation S/2004 N 1 when it was announced. The provisional designation indicates that it was the first Neptunian satellite identified in images dating from 2004. Follow-up Hubble observations of Hippocamp were conducted by Showalter in 2016, and the moon was later given its permanent Roman numeral designation by the Minor Planet Center after its recovery. Hippocamp was given the Roman numeral designation of Neptune XIV (14) on 25 September 2018, though it remained without an official name until February 2019.

By the International Astronomical Union's (IAU's) nomenclature guidelines, name proposals for Neptune's moons must be based on a figure from Greco-Roman mythology with a relationship to Poseidon or Neptune. Showalter and his team had sought for names since the announcement of their discovery; among the names considered was Polyphemus, the gigantic one-eyed son of Poseidon and Thoosa. Showalter then settled on the name Hippocamp in acknowledgement of the seahorse genus, Hippocampus, mainly for his passion for scuba diving and the animal itself. Showalter's name proposal was approved by the IAU's naming committee on 20 February 2019, and the name was announced in a press release by the Space Telescope Science Institute.

== Origin ==
Size comparison of Neptune's seven inner moons

The mass distribution of the Neptunian moons is the most lopsided of the satellite systems of the giant planets in the Solar System. One moon, Triton, makes up nearly all of the mass of the system, with all other moons together comprising only one third of one percent. The reason for the lopsidedness of the present Neptunian system is that Triton was captured from the Kuiper belt well after the formation of Neptune's original satellite system, much of which was destroyed in the process of capture. Triton's orbit upon capture is presumed to have been highly eccentric, which would have caused chaotic perturbations in the orbits of the original inner Neptunian satellites, leading to the ejection of some moons and the collisional destruction of others. At least some of Neptune's present inner satellites are thought to have then accreted from the resulting rubble after Triton's orbit was circularized by tidal deceleration.

Among these re-accreted moons are Proteus, the largest and outermost of Neptune's present inner moons. Proteus bears a large impact crater named Pharos, which has a diameter around 250 km (160 mi)—more than half the diameter of Proteus itself. This unusually large size of Pharos relative to Proteus implies that the impact event that formed the crater would have nearly disrupted Proteus and ejected a significant amount of debris. The present orbit of Proteus is situated relatively close to that of Hippocamp, which orbits just 12,000 km (7,500 mi) interior of Proteus. Their orbital semi-major axes differ by only ten percent, implying that both had likely originated from the same position in the past. This is further evidenced by accounting for the moons' respective outward orbital migration rates, which also suggests that Hippocamp and Proteus were much closer together in the past. Ordinarily, two adjoining objects of disparate sizes would have either resulted in the smaller object being ejected or colliding with the larger object—this does not appear to be the case for Hippocamp and Proteus.

Based on this evidence, Showalter and colleagues proposed that Hippocamp may have originated from debris ejected from Proteus by the cometary impact that formed its largest crater, Pharos. In this scenario, Hippocamp would be considered as a third-generation satellite of Neptune, originating from impacts on Neptune's reformed regular moons after the capture of Triton. The regular moons of Neptune are thought to have been disrupted by cometary impacts multiple times, with only Proteus surviving intact despite being nearly disrupted by the Pharos impact event. Some of the debris ejected by the impact settled into a stable orbit 1,000–2,000 km (620–1,240 mi) interior to Proteus, and coalesced into Hippocamp. However, Hippocamp only accounts for two percent of the missing volume of material generated by the Pharos impact event, and the reason for the absence of the rest of the debris remains unknown.

As with the other small inner moons of Neptune, Hippocamp is thought to have been repeatedly disrupted by comet impacts after it had coalesced from debris ejected from Proteus. Based on the formation rate of large craters on Proteus, Hippocamp is estimated to have been disrupted about nine times in the past 4 billion years, re-accreting back after each disruption event. These disruption events substantially reduce the moon's orbital eccentricity and inclination, providing an explanation for Hippocamp's present circular orbit despite its proximity to Proteus. Hippocamp had also likely lost some of its mass during these disruption events, possibly accounting for some of the missing volume of material ejected from the Pharos impact event. Proteus has since receded over 11,000 km (6,800 mi) from Neptune owing to tidal interactions with the planet, while Hippocamp remained close to its initial position where it formed as it migrates more slowly due to its smaller size.

== Physical characteristics ==
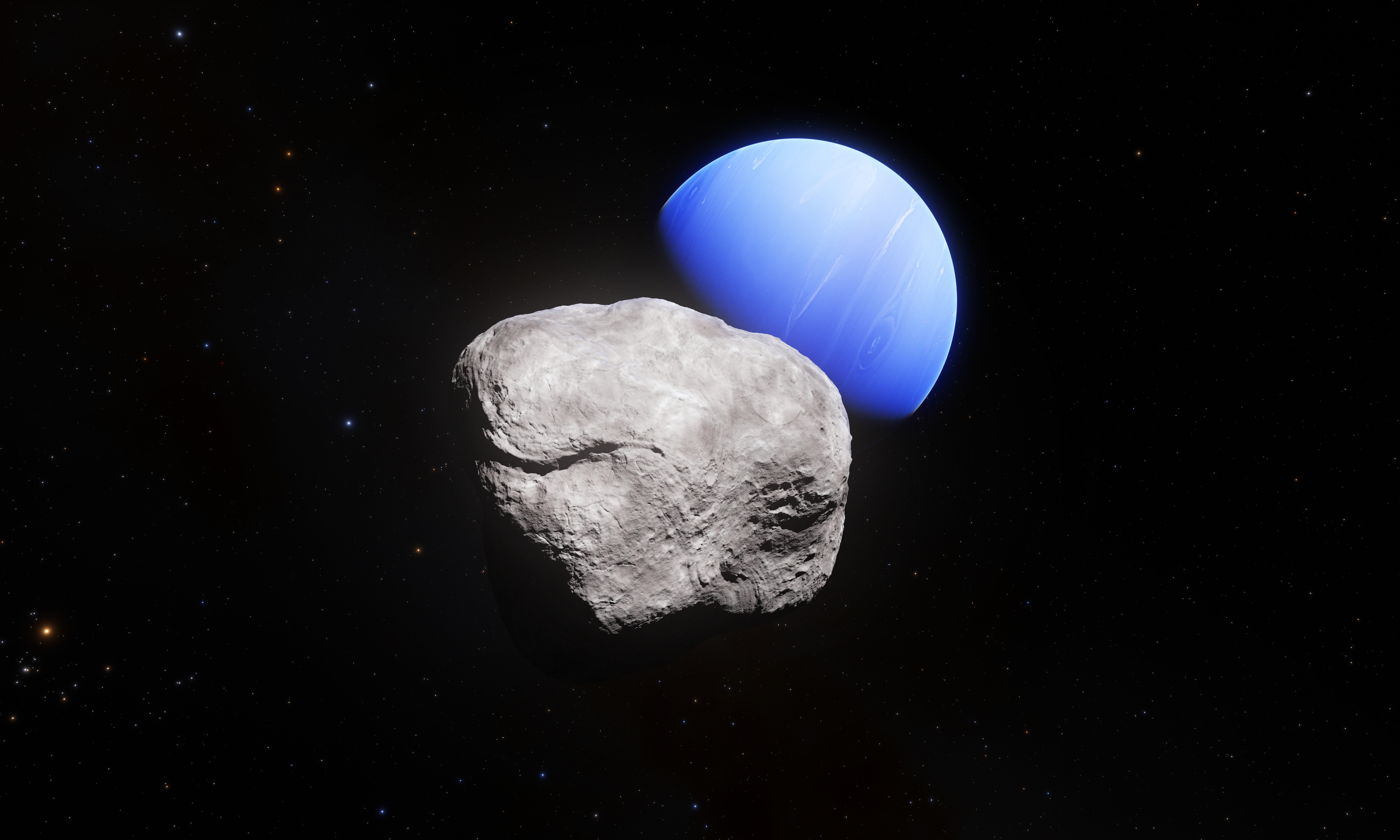
Artist's impression of Neptune and Hippocamp

Hippocamp is the second-smallest known moon of Neptune, with a diameter estimated at 34.8 km (21.6 mi). It is about 1,000 times less massive and 4,000 times less voluminous than its hypothesized progenitor, Proteus. Based on Hippocamp's estimated apparent magnitude of 26.5, its diameter was initially thought to be around 16–20 km (10–12 mi), but more recent observations revise this value upward two-fold. Nevertheless, it remains by a wide margin the smallest of Neptune's inner, regular, satellites.

The surface properties of Hippocamp are unknown as it was not extensively studied through different wavelengths of light, particularly in the near-infrared spectrum. Hippocamp is assumed to resemble Neptune's other inner satellites in having a dark surface. Their geometrical albedos range from 0.07 to 0.10, with the average being about 0.09. The Hubble Space Telescope's NICMOS instrument has examined Neptune's large inner moons in the near-infrared, and has found evidence that similar dark, reddish material, characteristic of small outer Solar System bodies, appears to be present on all their surfaces. The data is consistent with organic compounds containing C−H and/or C≡N bonds, but spectral resolution was inadequate to identify the molecules. Water ice, abundant in the outer Solar System, is believed to be present, but its spectral signature could not be observed (unlike the case of small Uranian moons).

== Orbit ==
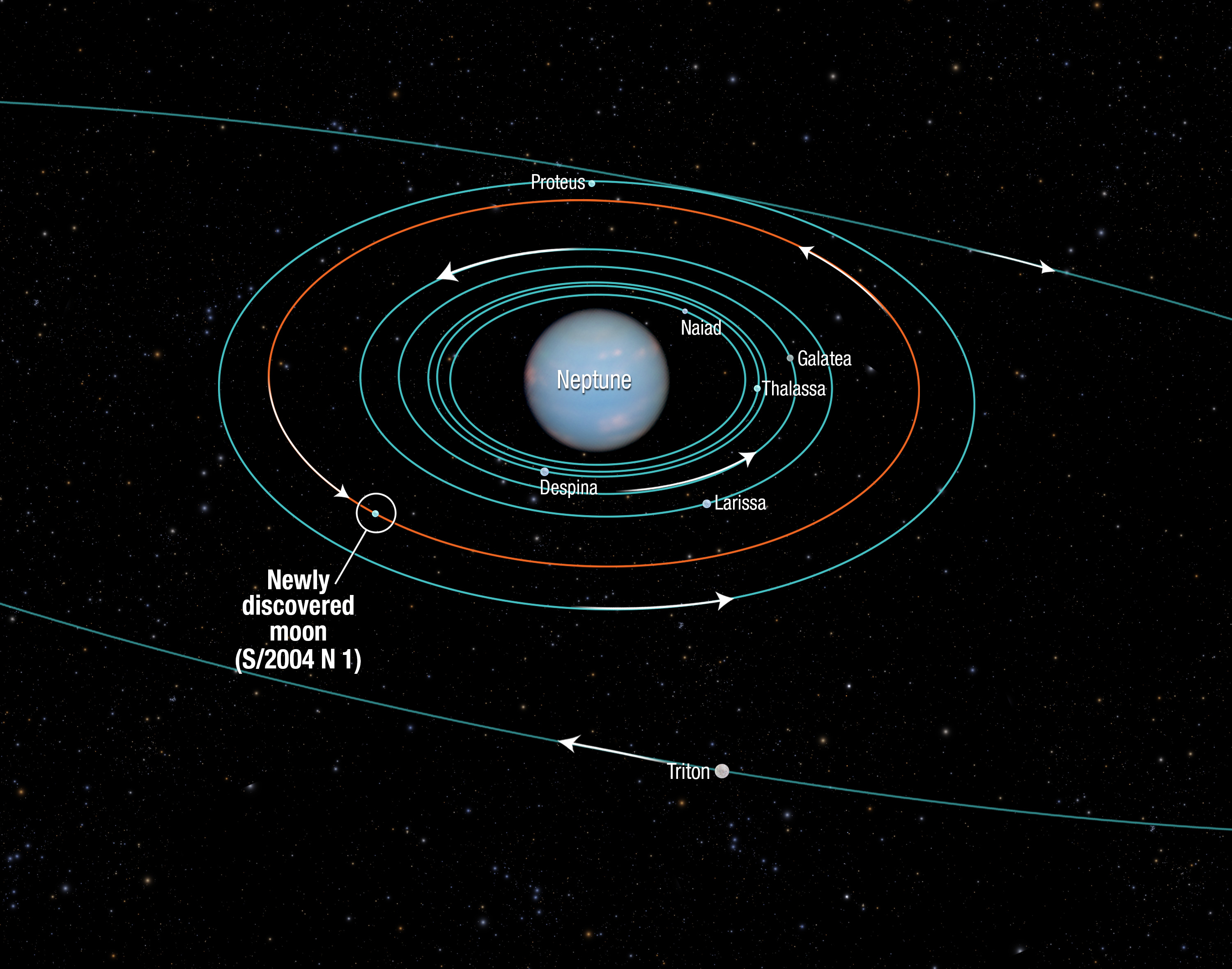
Diagram of the orbits of Neptune's moons out to Triton, with Hippocamp's orbit highlighted

Hippocamp completes one revolution around Neptune every 22 hours and 48 minutes (0.95 days), corresponding to a semi-major axis, or orbital distance of 105,283 km (65,420 mi). For comparison, this distance is approximately 4.3 Neptune radii, or just over a quarter of the Earth–Moon distance. (Note: Given Neptune's radius of 24,600 km and the Moon's semi-major axis of 384,400 km.) Both its inclination and eccentricity are close to zero. It orbits between Larissa and Proteus, making it the second outermost of Neptune's regular satellites. Its small size at this location runs counter to a trend among the other regular Neptunian satellites of increasing diameter with increasing distance from the primary.

Being situated at a relatively close distance to the much larger Proteus, Hippocamp is subjected to its significant gravitational influence. Its orbit is particularly sensitive to the mass of Proteus; orbital solutions using a variety of assumed masses for Proteus show that Hippocamp displays a significant in-orbit difference of around 100 km (62 mi). This can allow for an estimate of the mass of Proteus by observing its influence on Hippocamp's orbit for over a period of several decades.

Proteus and Hippocamp are nearly in a 11:13 mean-motion resonance, which may be the reason for Hippocamp's sensitivity to the mass of Proteus. Both moons are outside the Neptune-synchronous orbit (Neptune's rotational period is 0.67 days or 16.1 hours) and are thus being tidally accelerated by Neptune and are migrating outward. Compared to Hippocamp, Proteus migrates at a faster rate due to its higher mass and thus stronger tidal interaction with Neptune. Based on its orbital migration rate, Proteus is estimated to recede about 40 km (25 mi) from Neptune in 18 million years, in which it will enter a true 11:13 resonance with Hippocamp. Additionally, the present orbital periods of Larissa and Hippocamp are within about one percent of a 3:5 orbital resonance. (Note: Given the moons' respective periods of 0.55465 and 0.95 days, the actual ratios are 2.92:5.00.)
