= Lighthouse of Alexandria =

Ancient lighthouse in Egypt

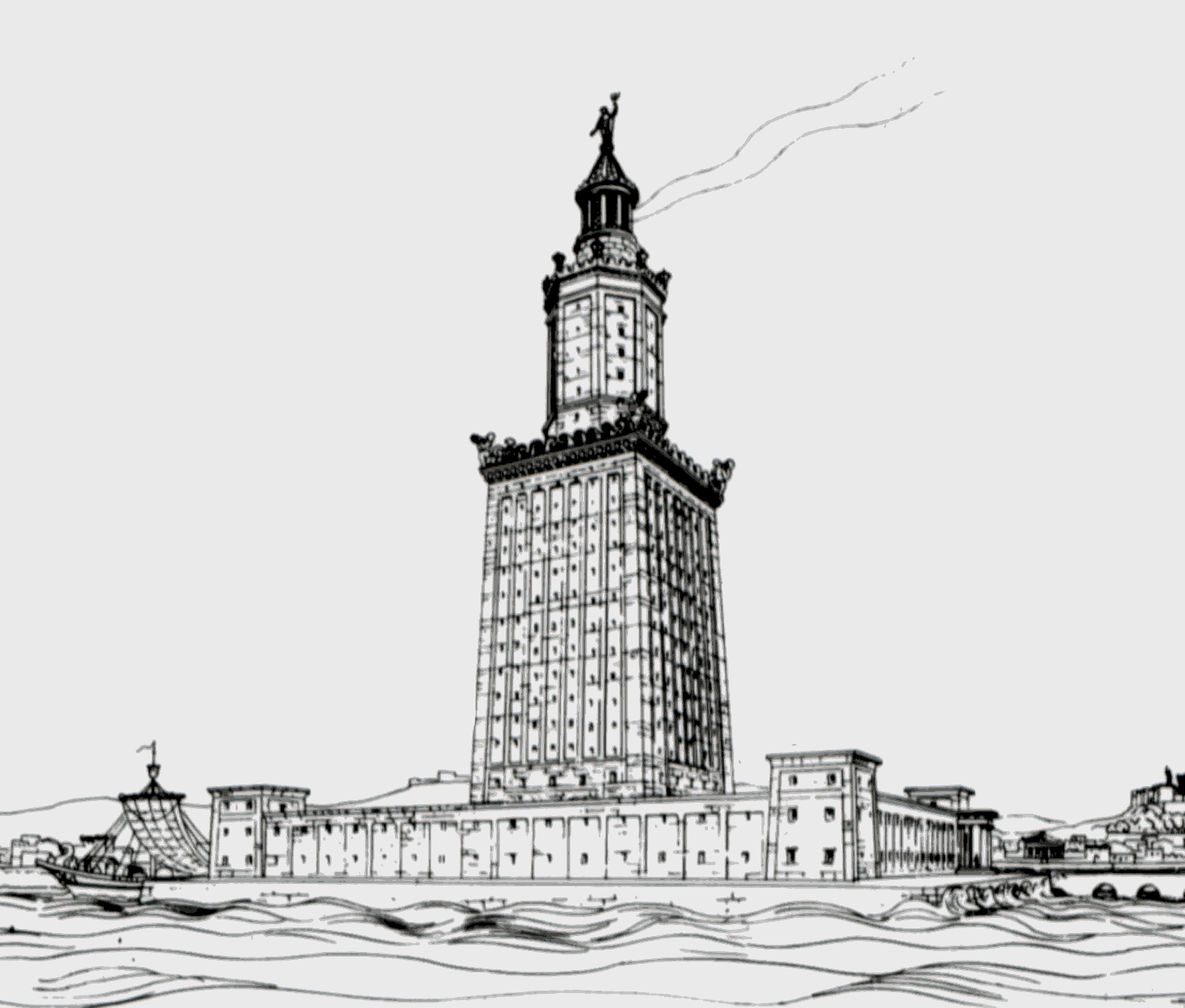
- Drawing by archaeologist Hermann Thiersch (1909)
- Location: Pharos, Alexandria, Egypt
- Coordinates: 31.2148°N 29.886°E

Tower
- Constructed: between 284 and 246 BC
- Foundation: Stone
- Construction: Masonry
- Height: 103 to 118 m (338 to 387 ft)
- Shape: Square (below), octagonal (middle) and cylindrical (top)

Light
- Deactivated: 1303 AD
- Range: 47 km (29 mi)

The Pharos of Alexandria (Note: (/ˈfɛərɒs/ FAIR-oss; Ancient Greek: ὁ Φάρος τῆς Ἀλεξανδρείας, romanized: ho Pháros tês Alexandreías, contemporary Koine Greek pronunciation: [ho pʰáros tɛ̂ːs aleksandrěːaːs]; Arabic: فنار الإسكندرية)) was a lighthouse built by the Ptolemaic Kingdom of Ancient Egypt, during the reign of Ptolemy II Philadelphus (280–247 BC). It has been estimated to have been at least 100 metres (330 ft) in overall height. One of the Seven Wonders of the Ancient World, for many centuries it was one of the world's tallest man-made structures.

The lighthouse was severely damaged by three earthquakes between AD 956 and 1303 and became an abandoned ruin. It was the third longest-surviving ancient wonder, after the Mausoleum at Halicarnassus and the extant Great Pyramid of Giza, surviving in part until 1480, when the last of its stones was used to build the Citadel of Qaitbay on the site.

In 1994, a team of French archaeologists dived in the water of Alexandria's Eastern Harbour and discovered some remains of the lighthouse on the sea floor. In 2016, the Ministry of State of Antiquities in Egypt had plans to turn submerged ruins of ancient Alexandria, including those of the Pharos, into an underwater museum.

In 2025, parts of the lighthouse's entrance, threshold stones, and foundation paving stones were resurfaced to aid in a digital reconstruction effort intended to help scholars with architectural reconstructions.

== Origin ==
Pharos was a small island on the western edge of the Nile Delta. In 332 BC, Alexander the Great founded the city of Alexandria on an isthmus opposite Pharos. Alexandria and Pharos were later connected by the Heptastadion, a mole spanning more than 1,200 metres (0.75 miles).

The east side of the mole became the Great Harbour, now an open bay; on the west side lay the port of Eunostos, with its inner basin Kibotos now vastly enlarged to form the modern harbour. Today's city development between the present Grand Square and the modern Ras el-Tin quarter is built on the silt which gradually widened and obliterated this mole. The Ras el-Tin promontory, where Ras el-Tin Palace was built in the 19th century, represents all that is left of the island of Pharos, the site of the lighthouse at its eastern point having been weathered away by the sea.

== Construction ==
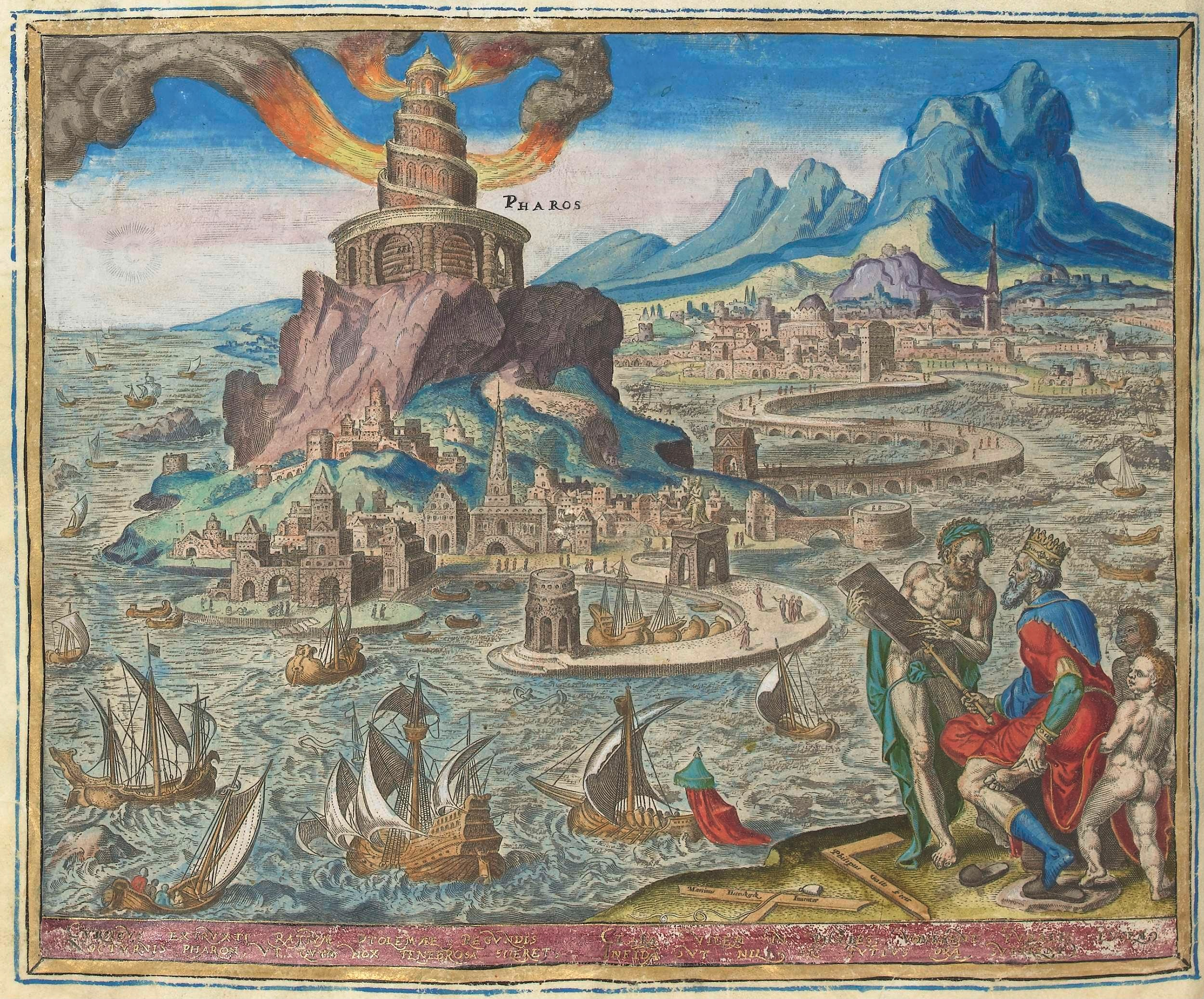
From the 1572 Octo Mundi Miracula, the earliest known representation of the lighthouse in modern times.

Maritime navigation to Alexandria was dangerous due to the northern coast of Africa's inconspicuous flat shores, shallow shoals, and submerged reefs. The lighthouse was constructed in the third century BC. After Alexander the Great died, Ptolemy the First (Ptolemy I Soter) declared himself king in 305 BC and commissioned its construction shortly thereafter. The building was finished during the reign of his son, Ptolemy II Philadelphus, and took twelve years to complete at a total cost of 800 talents of silver. The light was produced by a furnace at the top, and the tower was said to have been built mostly with solid blocks of limestone and granite.

In his encyclopedic manuscript Geographica, Strabo, who visited Alexandria in the late first century BC, reported that Sostratus of Cnidus had a dedication to the "Saviour Gods" inscribed in metal letters on the lighthouse. Writing in the first century AD, Pliny the Elder stated in his Natural History that Sostratus was the architect, although this conclusion is disputed. In his second century AD educational treatise How to Write History, Lucian claimed that Sostratus hid his name under plaster which bore the name of Ptolemy, so that when the plaster eventually fell off, Sostratus's name would be visible in the stone.

The blocks of sandstone and limestone used in the construction of the lighthouse have been scientifically analysed to discover where they originated, with mineralogical and chemical analysis pointing to the Wadi Hammamat quarries, in the desert to the east of Alexandria.

== Height and description ==
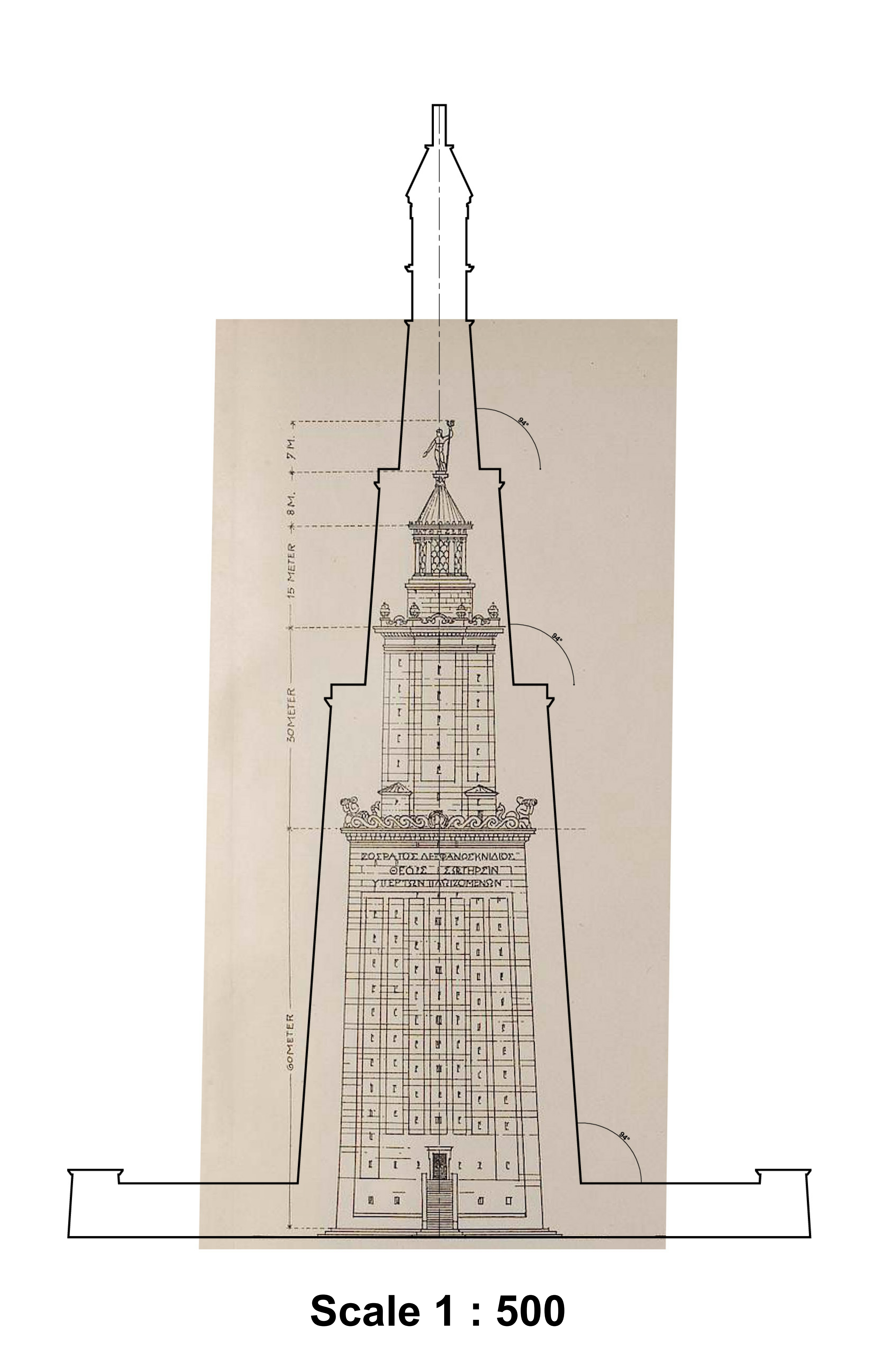
A size comparison between a 1909 (inner shape) and a 2006 study (outer shape) of the building

Arab descriptions of the lighthouse are consistent despite it undergoing several repairs after earthquake damage. Given heights vary only fifteen percent from 103 to 118 m (338 to 387 ft), on a 30 by 30 m (98 by 98 ft) square base.

The Arab authors indicate that the lighthouse was constructed from large blocks of light-coloured stone. The tower was made up of three tapering tiers: a lower square section with a central core; a middle octagonal section; and, at the top, a circular section. Al-Masudi wrote in the 10th century that the seaward side featured an inscription dedicated to Zeus. Geographer Al-Idrisi visited the lighthouse in 1154 and noted openings in the walls throughout the rectangular shaft with lead used as a filling agent in between the masonry blocks at the base. He reckoned the total height of the lighthouse to be 300 dhira rashashl (162 m).

At its apex was a mirror which reflected sunlight during the day; a fire was lit at night. Extant Roman coins struck by the Alexandrian mint show that a statue of Triton was positioned on each of the building's four corners, and a statue of Poseidon or Zeus stood on top.

The fullest description of the lighthouse comes from Arab traveller Abou Haggag Youssef Ibn Mohammed el-Balawi el-Andaloussi, who visited Alexandria in 1166. Balawi provided a description and measurement of the interior of the lighthouse's rectangular shaft. The inner ramp was described as roofed with masonry at 7 shibr (189 cm, 6.2 ft), noted as to allow two horsemen to pass at once. In clockwise rotation, the ramp held four storeys with eighteen, fourteen, and seventeen rooms on the second, third, and fourth floors, respectively.

Balawi reported the base of the lighthouse to be 45 ba (30 m, 100 ft) long on each side with connecting ramp 600 dhira (300 m, 984 ft) long by 20 dhira (10 m, 32 ft) wide. The octagonal section was 24 ba (16.4 m, 54 ft) in width, and the diameter of the cylindrical section 12.73 ba (8.7 m, 28.5 ft). The apex of the lighthouse's oratory was measured with diameter 6.4 ba (4.3 m 20.9 ft).

Later accounts of the lighthouse after the destruction by the 1303 Crete earthquake include Ibn Battuta, a Moroccan scholar and explorer, who passed through Alexandria in 1326 and 1349. Battuta noted that the wrecked condition of the lighthouse was then only noticeable by the rectangle tower and entrance ramp. He stated the tower to be 140 shibr (30.8 m, 101 ft) on each side. Battuta detailed Sultan An-Nasir Muhammad's plan to build a new lighthouse near the site of the collapsed one, but these went unfulfilled after the Sultan's death in 1341.

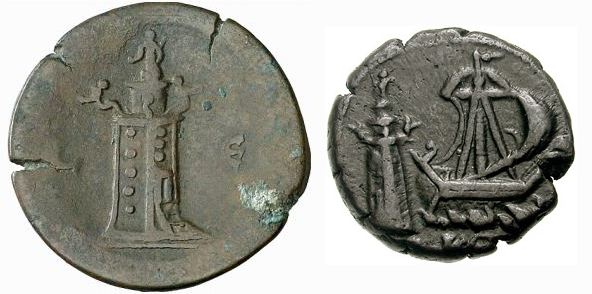
The lighthouse on coins minted in Alexandria in the second century AD (1: reverse of a coin of Antoninus Pius, and 2: reverse of a coin of Commodus)

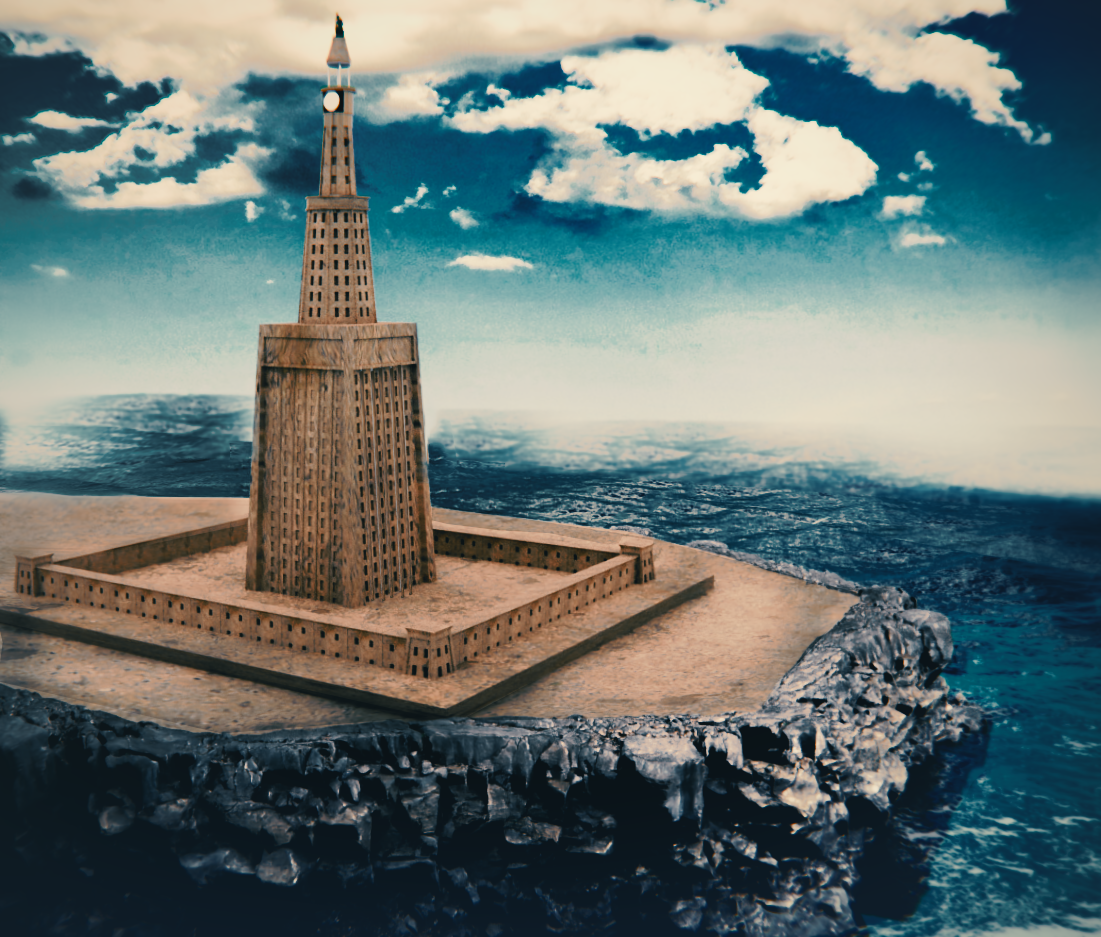
A 3D reconstruction of the Lighthouse of Alexandria

== Destruction ==
The lighthouse was partially cracked and damaged by earthquakes in 796 and 951, followed by structural collapse in the earthquake of 956, and then again in 1303. Earthquakes propagate from two well known tectonic boundaries, the African–Arabian and Red Sea Rift zones, respectively 350 and 520 km from the lighthouse's location. Documentation shows the 956 earthquake to be the first to cause structural collapse of the top 20 metres of the construction.

Documented repairs after the 956 earthquake include the installation of an Islamic-style dome after the collapse of the statue that previously topped the structure. The most destructive earthquake in 1303 had an estimated intensity of VIII+ originating from Crete (280–350 km from Alexandria). The stubby remnant disappeared in 1480, when the sultan of Egypt, Qaitbay, built a medieval fort on the larger platform of the lighthouse site using the fallen stone.

The 10th-century Arab writer al-Mas'udi reports a legendary tale of the lighthouse's destruction, according to which, in the time of Caliph Abd al-Malik ibn Marwan (r. 705–715), the Byzantines sent a eunuch agent, who adopted Islam, gained the caliph's confidence and secured permission to search for hidden treasure at the base of the lighthouse. The search was cunningly made in such a manner that the foundations were undermined, and the Pharos collapsed. The agent managed to escape in a ship waiting for him.

== Archaeological research and rediscovery ==
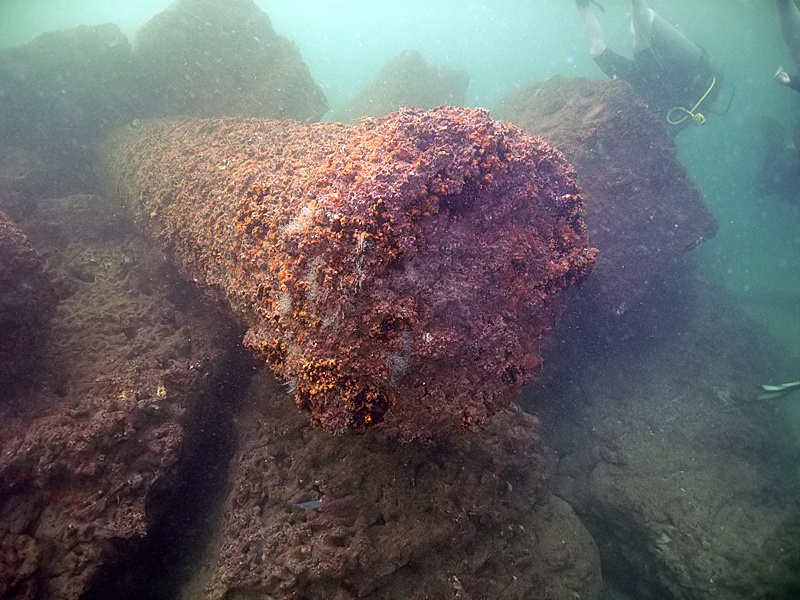
Lighthouse remains found in the Mediterranean Sea

In 1916, Gaston Jondet made the first detailed description of the submerged ruins of the old port of Alexandria. He was followed by Raymond Weill in the same year, and by Sir Leopold Halliday Savile in 1940.

In 1968, the lighthouse was rediscovered. UNESCO sponsored an expedition of marine archaeologists, led by Honor Frost. She confirmed the existence of the lighthouse's ruins. Exploration was postponed for lack of specialised archaeologists and because the area was becoming a military zone.

In late 1994, a team of French archaeologists led by Jean-Yves Empereur re-discovered the physical remains of the lighthouse on the floor of Alexandria's Eastern Harbour. He worked with cinematographer Asma el-Bakri who used a 35 mm camera to take the first underwater pictures of the scattered remains of collapsed columns and statues. Empereur's most significant findings consisted of blocks of granite 49–60 tonnes in mass often broken into multiple pieces, 30 sphinxes, 5 obelisks and columns with carvings dating back to Ramses II (1279–1213 BC).

By the end of 1995, Empereur and his team completed cataloguing over 3,300 pieces. They used a combination of photography and mapping. Thirty-six pieces of Empereur's granite blocks and other discoveries have been restored and are on display in Alexandrian museums. Satellite imaging has revealed further remains. In the early 1990s, the underwater archaeologist Franck Goddio began exploration at the opposite side of the harbour from where Empereur's team had worked.

Satellite and sonar imaging has revealed additional remains of wharves, houses, and temples collapsed into the sea by earthquakes and by other natural disasters. One can dive and see the ruins.

In 2012, the secretariat of the UNESCO Convention on the Protection of the Underwater Cultural Heritage was working with the Government of Egypt to add the Bay of Alexandria (including the lighthouse remains) to a World Heritage List of submerged cultural sites.

== Significance ==
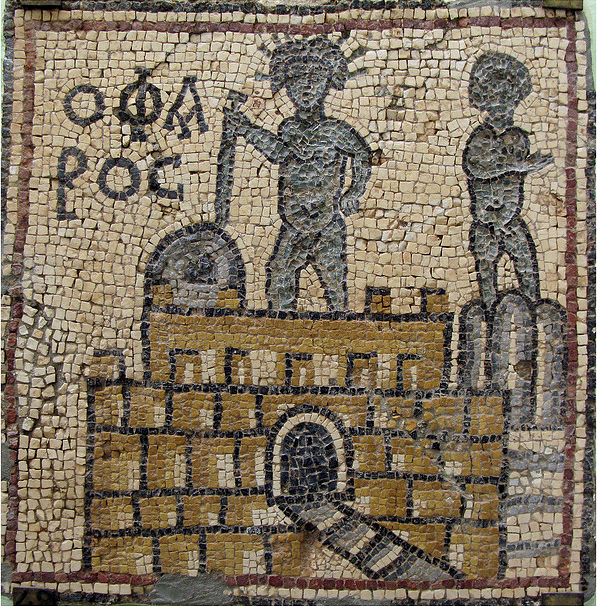
A mosaic depicting the Pharos of Alexandria (labelled "Ο ΦΑΡΟϹ"), from Olbia, Libya, c. 4th century AD

Legend has it that the people of the island of Pharos were wreckers; hence, Ptolemy I Soter had the lighthouse built to help guide ships into port at night.

The etymology of "Pharos" is uncertain. The word became generalised in modern Greek to mean "lighthouse" (φάρος 'fáros'), and was borrowed by many Romance languages such as Catalan or Romanian (far), French (phare), Italian and Spanish (faro) – and thence into Esperanto (faro), and Portuguese (farol), and even some Slavic languages like Bulgarian (far). In French, Portuguese, Spanish, Turkish, Serbian, Bulgarian, Croatian and Russian, a derived word means "headlight" (phare, farol, faro, far, фар, фара).

== Proposed reconstruction ==
Since 1978 proposals have been made to replace the lighthouse with a modern reconstruction. In 2015, the Egyptian government and the Alexandria governorate suggested building a skyscraper on the site of the lighthouse as part of the regeneration of the eastern harbour of Alexandria Port.

== Pharos in culture ==
The lighthouse remains a civic symbol of the city of Alexandria and of the Alexandria Governorate with which the city is more or less coterminous. A stylised representation of the lighthouse appears on the flag and seal of the Governorate and on many public services of the city, including the seal of Alexandria University.

=== In architecture ===
- A well-preserved ancient tomb in the town of Abusir, 48 kilometres (30 mi) southwest of Alexandria, is thought to be a scaled-down model of the Alexandria Pharos. Known colloquially under various names – the Pharos of Abusir, the Abusir funerary monument and Burg al-Arab (Arab's Tower) – it consists of a 3-storey tower, approximately 20 metres (66 ft) in height, with a square base, an octagonal midsection and cylindrical upper section, like the building upon which it was apparently modelled. It dates to the reign of Ptolemy II (285–246 BC), and is therefore likely to have been built at about the same time as the Alexandria Pharos.
- The design of minarets in many early Egyptian Islamic mosques followed a three-stage design similar to that of the Pharos, attesting to the building's broader architectural influence.
- The George Washington Masonic National Memorial, in Alexandria, Virginia, is fashioned after the ancient Lighthouse.
- A fictionalized version of the structure – known as the "Pharos Lighthouse" – serves as the park icon, centerpiece, and identifier of Universal Islands of Adventure theme park, opened in 1999 at the Universal Orlando Resort. The real, functioning lighthouse resides in the park's Port of Entry area.

=== In literature ===
- Julius Caesar, in his Civil Wars (Part III, 111–112), describes the Pharos and its strategic importance. Gaining control of the lighthouse helped him subdue Ptolemy XIII's armies (48 BC):
  Now because of the narrowness of the strait there can be no access by ship to the harbour without the consent of those who hold the Pharos. In view of this, Caesar took the precaution of landing his troops while the enemy was preoccupied with fighting, seized the Pharos and posted a garrison there. The result was that safe access was secured for his corn supplies and reinforcements.
- The Romano-Jewish historian Josephus (37 – c. 100 AD) describes it in his book The Jewish War (4.10.5) when he gives a geographical overview of Egypt.
- It was described in the Zhu fan zhi ("Records of Foreign Peoples") by Zhao Rugua (1170–1228), a Chinese customs inspector for the southern port city of Quanzhou during the Song dynasty.
- Ibn Battuta visited the lighthouse in 1326, finding "one of its faces in ruins", yet he could enter and noted a place for the guardian of the lighthouse to sit and many other chambers. When he returned in 1349, he "found that it had fallen into so ruinous a condition that it was impossible to enter it or to climb up to the doorway".

=== Other ===
In classical antiquity, an annual Jewish festival was held on the island of Pharos to honour the translation of the Jewish Scriptures into Greek, traditionally believed to have been completed there under Ptolemy II. On this occasion, a large Jewish crowd, along with some non-Jewish visitors, would gather on the beach for a grand picnic. Jewish philosopher Philo of Alexandria (c. 20 BCE – c. 50 CE) shed light on the site's symbolism, writing that the Jews honoured "the place where the light of that translation first shone out", expressing gratitude to God for this gift.

A crater on Neptune's moon Proteus, is named Pharos, after the island. It is the largest known impact crater on Proteus and the moon's only named surface feature.

Flag of the Alexandria Governorate, featuring the lighthouse

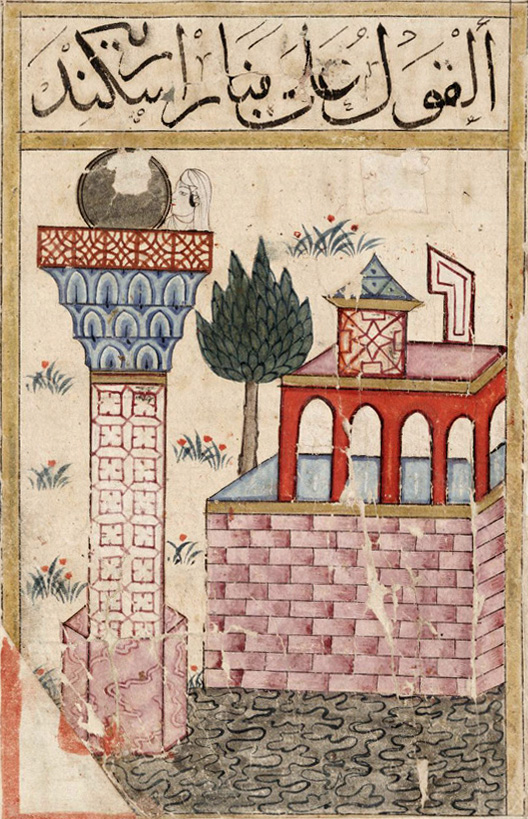
The lighthouse as depicted in the Book of Wonders, a late 14th-century Arabic text

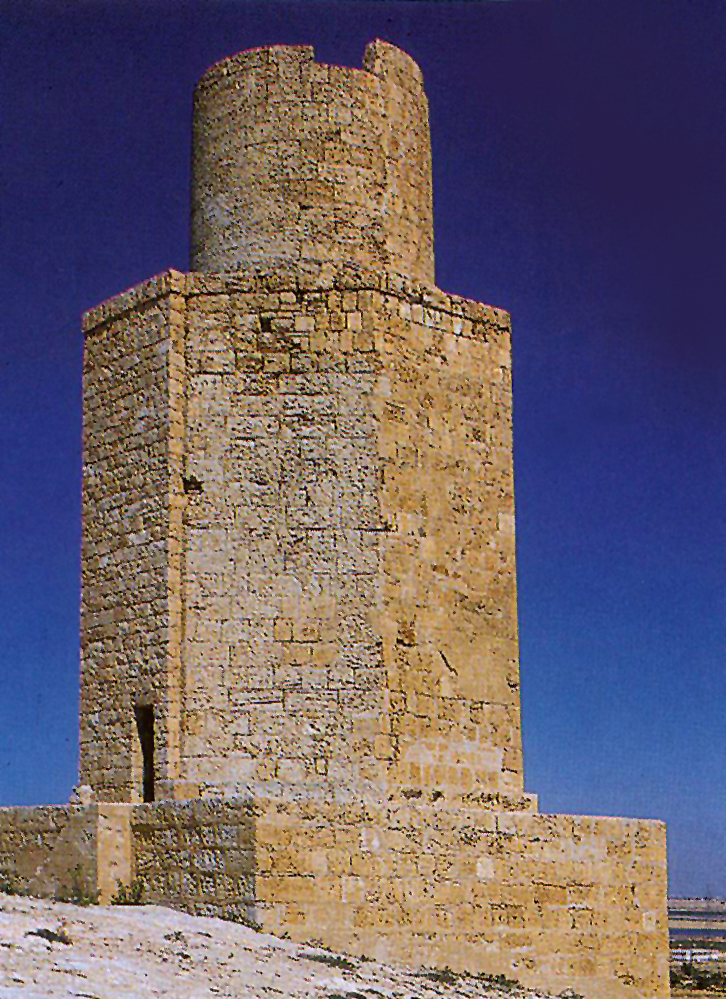
The Pharos of Abusir, an ancient funerary monument thought to be modelled after the Pharos at Alexandria, with which it is approximately contemporaneous

== See also ==
- List of tallest structures built before the 20th century
- Minar (Firuzabad)
- Tower of Hercules, a Roman lighthouse in Spain

== Notes ==
Records
| Preceded by Unknown | World's tallest tower 280 BC – 1180 AD | Succeeded by Malmesbury Abbey tower |
