= Asma El Bakry =

Egyptian film director, author and illustrator

Asma El Bakry أسماء البكري
- Born: 28 October 1947; Cairo
- Died: 5 January 2015 (aged 67)
- Citizenship: Egypt
- Education: French literature, University of Alexandria.
- Alma mater: University of Alexandria
- Occupations: film director, author and illustrator.
- Notable work: Al Fatimiyun (The Fatimids)

Asma El Bakry (Arabic: أسماء البكري; 28 October 1947 – 5 January 2015) (something written as Asmaa El-Bakri and other variations) was an Egyptian film director, author and illustrator. She was born in Cairo, moving to Alexandria as a young girl with her mother and brother. She attended the renowned French school, Notre Dame de Sion and Lycée, and earned a BA in French literature from the University of Alexandria in 1970.

El Bakry worked in the film industry for many years, including as an assistant to noted Egyptian director Youssef Chahine, as well as with Saad Arafa and Khairy Beshara.

She also worked as an author, illustrator and as a production manager.

As a production manager, El Bakry made about twenty documentaries in Egypt for the BBC. She also made a number of short films and worked on Raymond Depardon's Une Femme en Afrique. She made her first feature as a director in 1991, Beggars and Nobles, which she also co-produced. It could be argued that most of her documentaries reveal deep interest in Egyptian history and a keen desire to shed light on its past civilizations with the ultimate aim of instructing the new generation. In Dahsha, for instance, she traces the history of wooden boats used by the ancient Egyptians until modern times. In El Zaher District (Hay el Daher), she sheds light on the history of that district in Cairo, which was established by the Sultan Zaher Bibars in the thirteenth century.

Her fascination with the Islamic civilization is evident in her work on the Fatimids and the Ayubbids.

While filming Mathaf al Iskandariya, a documentary about the Greco-Roman Museum in Alexandria, El Bakry filmed the recovery of what were thought to be remains of the Pharos of Alexandria. After finding that works to stabilize the adjacent Citadel of Qaitbay were destroying ancient artifacts, she went public with her concerns, forcing the Egyptian authorities to stop their works.

== Early career life ==
Asma El Bakry did not have the support of her family when it came to her filmmaking career. Her mother felt that reading books was more cultivating for Asma than was watching films. Thus, El Bakry was on her own in respect to her interest in a film career, which started at a young age.

When she first started in school, she would cast her classmates and play the role of the director herself. During her last year at university, she attended the shooting of the film A House Made of Sand (Bayt min al-rimâl) in 1972. El Bakry was a swimming champion, and she volunteered to do the difficult stunt of pretending to drown in the rough, cold sea in place of Poussi, who was the lead role. She volunteered to help in general, and got so caught up in the making of the film that she became an indispensable hand on location. It was meeting with Abdel Aziz Fahmy, the film's Director of photography, which was to change the course of her life, for he was the one who helped her into the film business by allowing her to work as an assistant in his next film Strangers (Ghorbâ’), directed by Saad Arafa.

== Filmography ==
Year	Title (English translation)	Honours
1979	Qatrat ma' (Drop of Water)	Best Short Film at the Alexandria Film Festival; Prize of Saad Nadin at the Egyptian Documentary Film Festival in 1980
1981	Burtreh (Portrait)	
1981	Dahsha (Surprise)	
1982	Hayy al - Daher (Daher District)	
1982	Al Rukham (Marble)	
1991	Shahatin wa Nubala (Beggars and Nobles)	Critics Prize, International Confederation of Art Cinemas (CICAE) prize, and Audience Grand Prize, Montpellier; Audience Prize, Freiburg 1992; Grand Prix of the International Jury in Rennes, 1992)
1995	Mathaf al Iskandariya (Museum of Alexandria)	
1998	Kunchirtu fi darb sa'ada (Concert in the Street of Happiness)	
2001	Al Fatimiyun (The Fatimids)	
2003	Al Alyubiyun (The Ayubbids)	
2004	Al Unf wa al sukhriya (Violence and Derision)	

== Sources ==
- Hillauer, Rebecca. Encyclopedia of Arab Women Filmmakers. Cairo: American University in Cairo, 2005. Print.
- "Asma El Bakri, AlexCinema." Asma El Bakri, AlexCinema. N.p., n.d. Web. 12 Dec. 2016.
