= Proteus (moon) =

Large moon of Neptune

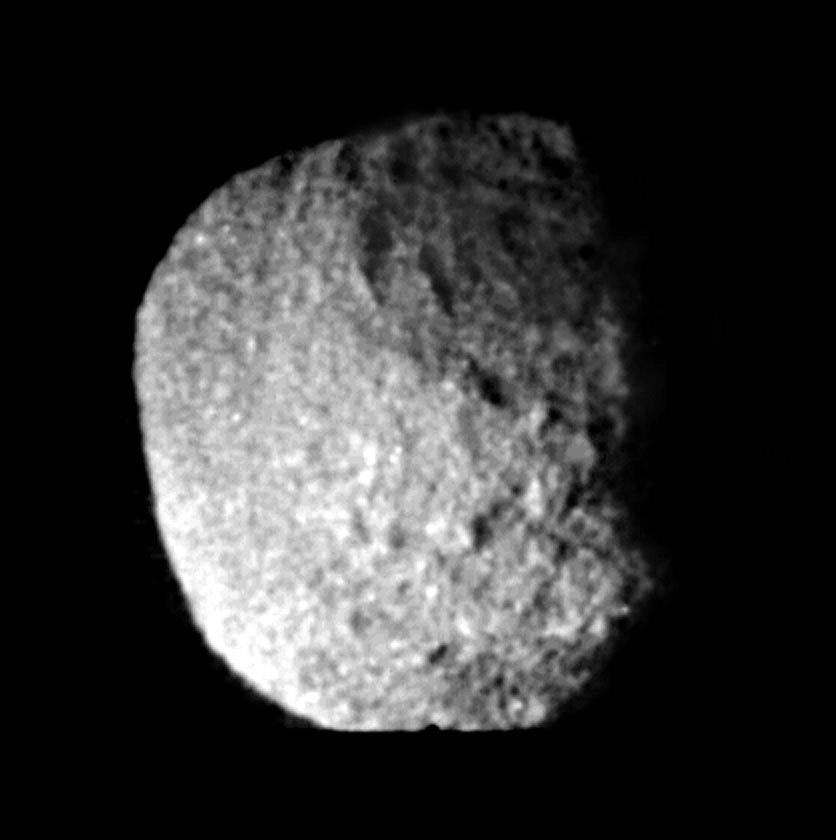
- Processed grayscale image of Proteus from Voyager 2, August 1989 (image processing date). The massive crater Pharos occupies much of the upper right, straddling Proteus's terminator

Discovery
- Discovered by: Voyager 2 Stephen P. Synnott
- Discovery date: June 16, 1989

Designations
- Designation: Neptune VIII
- Pronunciation: /ˈproʊtiəs/ PROH-tee-əs
- Named after: Πρωτεύς or Πρωτέας, Prōteys or Prōteas
- Alternative names: S/1989 N 1
- Adjectives: Protean (/ˈproʊtiən/ PROH-tee-ən or /proʊˈtiːən/ proh-TEE-ən)

Orbital characteristics
- Epoch 1 January 2020
- Periapsis: 117592 km
- Apoapsis: 117702 km
- Semi-major axis: 117647 km (4.75 R_{N})
- Eccentricity: 0.00047
- Orbital period (sidereal): 1.12231 d
- Average orbital speed: 7.623 km/s
- Mean motion: 320.766°/d
- Inclination: 0.042° (to local Laplace plane)
- Satellite of: Neptune

Physical characteristics
- Dimensions: 424 × 390 × 396 km (Note: In other papers slightly different dimensions were reported. Thomas and Veverka in 1991 reported 440 × 416 × 404 km. Croft in 1992 reported 430 × 424 × 410 km. Karkoschka in 2003 reported 454 × 424 × 404 km. The difference is caused by the use of different sets of images and by the fact that the shape of Proteus is not described well by a triaxial ellipsoid.)
- Mean radius: 210±7 km 209±8 km 208±8 km
- Volume: (3.4±0.4)×10^{7} km^{3}
- Mass: ≈ (1.55–3.10)×10^{19} kg (Note: A density of 0.4–0.8 g/cm^{3} was calculated when assuming the volume as a sphere with a radius of 210±7 km, and assuming it has a similar density to that of Despina and Galatea. The mass was calculated with the provided density and the assumed volume.) ≈ (2.60–5.20)×10^{−6} Earths
- Mean density: ≈ 0.46–0.91 g/cm^{3} (Note: Density obtained from the calculated mass and the provided volume of (3.4±0.4)×10^{7} km^{3} from Stooke (1994).)
- Surface gravity: ≈ 0.023–0.054 m/s^{2} (Note: Surface gravity derived from the mass m, the gravitational constant G and the radius r: $\frac{Gm}{r^2}$)
- Escape velocity: ≈ 0.099–0.146 km/s (Note: Escape velocity derived from the mass m, the gravitational constant G and the radius r: $\sqrt{\frac{2Gm}{r}}$)
- Synodic rotation period: synchronous
- Axial tilt: zero
- Albedo: 0.096 (geometric); 0.2–0.3 (Bond)
- Temperature: 47.4±0.7 K
- Apparent magnitude: 19.75
- Absolute magnitude (H): 5.05

Proteus (/ˈproʊtiəs/ PROH-tee-əs), also known as Neptune VIII, is the second-largest moon of Neptune and the planet's largest inner satellite. Discovered by Voyager 2 in 1989, it is named after Proteus, the shape-shifting sea god in Greek mythology. Proteus is about 400 km (250 mi) in diameter and orbits Neptune in a nearly equatorial orbit at a distance of about 4.75 Neptune radii from the planet's center.

Proteus has a highly irregular shape that differs significantly from an ellipsoid. It resembles an irregular polyhedron with several slightly concave facets and surface relief of up to 20 km (12 mi). Its surface is dark, nearly neutral in color, and heavily cratered. The largest crater, Pharos, is more than 230 km (140 mi) across. The surface also contains numerous cliffs, grooves, and valleys associated with large impact craters.

Proteus is unlikely to have formed alongside Neptune. Instead, it probably accreted from debris produced after the capture of Neptune's largest moon, Triton.

== Discovery and naming ==
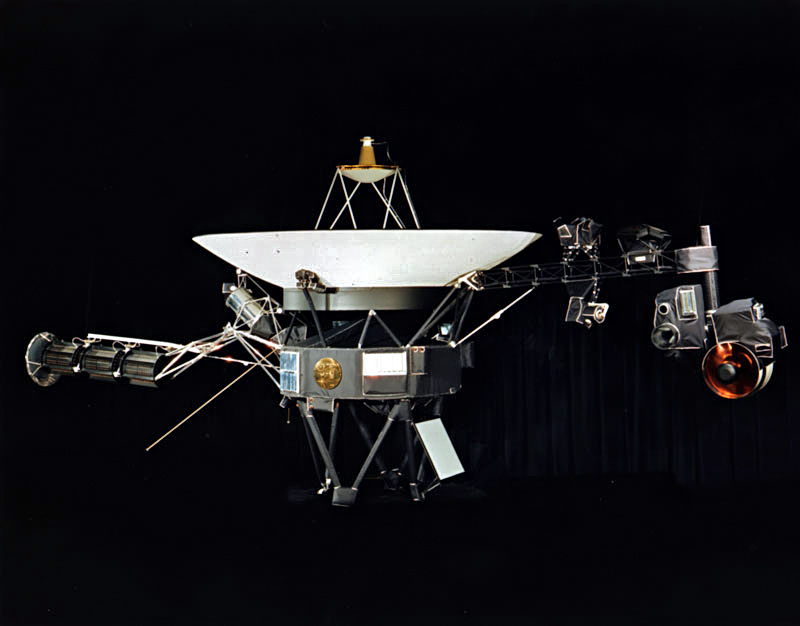
Voyager 2, the space probe that discovered Proteus

Proteus was discovered in images taken by the Voyager 2 spacecraft during its approach to Neptune in 1989, about two months before its closest flyby. Its discovery came 40 years after that of Neptune's moon Nereid in 1949.

Following its discovery, the moon received the provisional designation S/1989 N 1. Stephen P. Synnott and Bradford A. Smith announced the discovery on July 7, 1989, describing it as being identified in "17 frames taken over 21 days", indicating a discovery date sometime before June 16.

On September 16, 1991, S/1989 N 1 was officially named Proteus after the shape-shifting sea god of Greek mythology, following the convention of naming Neptune's moons after sea deities and mythological sea creatures.

== Orbit ==
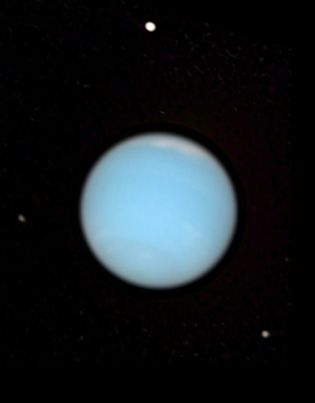
Hubble Space Telescope image of Neptune and Proteus

Proteus orbits Neptune at an average distance of approximately 117,647 km (73,102 mi), or about 4.75 times Neptune's equatorial radius. It completes one orbit every 1.1 days. Its orbit is nearly circular, with an eccentricity of 0.00047, and is inclined by about 0.04 degrees. Proteus is tidally locked to Neptune, rotating once per orbit so that the same hemisphere always faces the planet.

Proteus may once have been in a 1:2 orbital resonance with Larissa, completing one orbit for every two made by Larissa. As Proteus gradually migrated outward because of tidal interactions with Neptune, this resonance was broken, likely several hundred million years ago.

== Physical characteristics ==
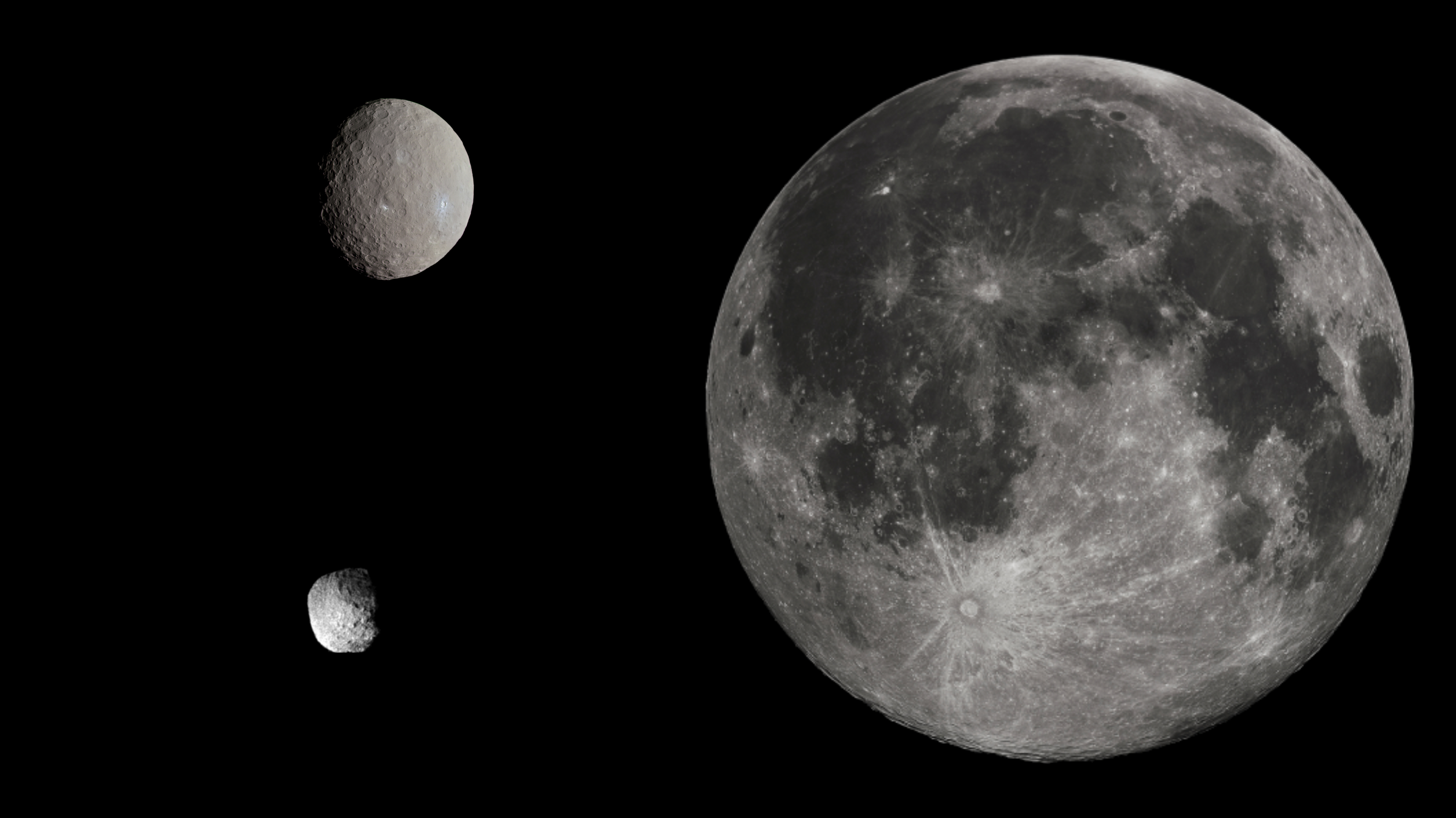
Proteus compared to 1 Ceres and the Moon

Proteus is the second-largest moon of Neptune and the largest of its regular prograde satellites. It is about 420 km (260 mi) in diameter, making it larger than Nereid, Neptune's third-largest moon. Because it orbits so close to Neptune, Proteus remained undiscovered by Earth-based telescopes, as it is obscured by the planet's bright reflected light.

=== Composition ===
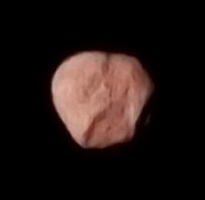
False-color Voyager 2 image of Proteus, with its large crater Pharos located at the right

Proteus has a dark surface with a geometric albedo of about 10 percent, meaning it reflects only about one-tenth of the sunlight that reaches it. Its leading hemisphere is brighter than its trailing hemisphere by about 0.1 magnitude. Its surface is nearly neutral in color, with little change in reflectivity across visible wavelengths. In the near-infrared, at wavelengths around 2 μm, its reflectivity decreases, suggesting the presence of complex organic compounds such as hydrocarbons or cyanides. These materials may contribute to the low albedo of Neptune's inner moons. Measurements at wavelengths of 1.4, 2.1, 3.0, and 4.6 μm show that Proteus has infrared reflectance properties similar to those of other dark small bodies in the Solar System, including 2004 EW_{95}.

Spectroscopic observations indicate that Proteus's surface contains hydrated minerals, possibly including ammonia-bearing materials, as well as weak carbon dioxide absorption that is slightly stronger on the trailing hemisphere. These findings suggest that Proteus is primarily a rocky body. Unlike Larissa, Galatea, and Neptune's rings, Proteus appears to be relatively poor in phyllosilicates. This may indicate that impacts have dehydrated phyllosilicate minerals on its surface or that Proteus formed from material different from that of Larissa and Galatea.

=== Shape ===
Proteus is approximately spherical, with a mean radius of about 210 km (130 mi), although its shape deviates from a true sphere by as much as 20 km (12 mi). It is thought to be close to the maximum size a body of its density can attain without its gravity pulling it into hydrostatic equilibrium. Proteus is slightly elongated toward Neptune, but its overall shape more closely resembles an irregular polyhedron than a triaxial ellipsoid. Its surface includes several flat or slightly concave facets measuring 150 to 200 km (93 to 124 mi) across, which are thought to be degraded impact craters.

=== Surface features ===
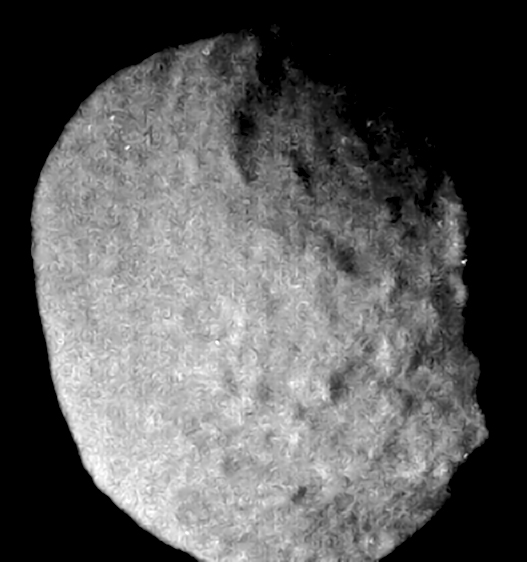
Voyager 2 image of Proteus, digitally processed showing surface features

Proteus is heavily cratered and shows no evidence of significant geological resurfacing. Its largest crater, Pharos, is 255 ± 12 km in diameter and about 10 to 15 km (6.2 to 9.3 mi) deep. The crater contains a central dome several kilometers high. Pharos is the only named surface feature on Proteus. It is named after the Lighthouse of Alexandria, which is associated with Proteus in Greek mythology. In addition to Pharos, the moon has several craters 50 to 100 km (31 to 62 mi) across and many smaller craters less than 50 km (31 mi) in diameter.

Proteus also has linear features, including cliffs, valleys, and grooves. The most prominent of these lies west of Pharos and runs roughly parallel to the equator. These features may have formed during the impacts that created Pharos and the other large craters or as a result of tidal stresses exerted by Neptune.

=== Named feature ===
Craters on Proteus are named after water-related spirits, gods, and goddesses, excluding figures from Greek and Roman mythology. As of May 2024, only one crater on Proteus, Pharos, has been named.

Crater	Pronunciation	Diameter	Approval Year	Eponym	Ref
Pharos	/ˈfɛərɒs/ FAIR-oss	255 ± 12 km	1994	Lighthouse of Alexandria (Pharos), island where Proteus reigned	WGPSN

== Origin ==
Proteus, like Neptune's other inner moons, is unlikely to have formed alongside the planet. Instead, it probably accreted from debris produced after the capture of Triton. Following its capture, Triton is thought to have occupied a highly eccentric orbit that gravitationally disrupted Neptune's original inner satellites, causing them to collide and break apart into a debris disk. After Triton's orbit became nearly circular, some of this debris re-accreted to form Neptune's present-day inner moons.

Proteus may originally have orbited about 8,000 km (5,000 mi) closer to Neptune than it does today. Over time, tidal interactions caused the moon to migrate outward. During this migration, impacts may have created its largest craters and ejected fragments into orbit around Neptune. One such impact has been proposed as the origin of Neptune's small moon Hippocamp, which orbits close to Proteus.
