= Terrain softening =

Terrain with smoothly rpunded edges

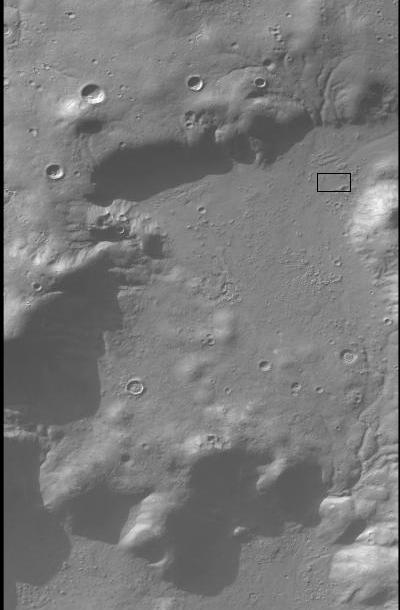
Softened terrain in Argyre Planitia, 39 °S. Image is around 25 km across. Note the lack of any sharp ridges anywhere in the image.

The landscape polewards of around 30 degrees latitude on Mars has a distinctively different appearance to that nearer the equator, and is said to have undergone terrain softening. Softened terrain lacks the sharp ridge crests seen near the equator, and is instead smoothly rounded. This rounding is thought to be caused by high concentrations of water ice in soils. The term was coined in 1986 by Steve Squyres and Michael Carr from examining imagery from the Viking missions to Mars.

Below 30 degrees of latitude, impact craters have steep walls; well-defined, sharp rims; and flat or smoothly bowl-shaped floors. Ridges on intercrater plains come to similarly well-defined, pointed crests. However, above this latitude, these same features appear very different. The crests seen on ridges and crater rims appear strongly rounded and much more poorly defined. The relief (height) of features is somewhat reduced. Small craters are noticeably less common. In other words, terrain which elsewhere looked sharp here looks "soft". This texture has also been described as "smooth", or "rolling". Softened craters are also commonly infilled with concentric patterns on their floors.

On Earth, diffusive creep of soils is associated with rounded hillslopes. Squyres and Carr thus attributed the softened texture to accelerated viscous creep in shallow soils near the surface, and went on to associate this accelerated creep with the presence of ground ice at these latitudes. This conclusion has been largely borne out by subsequent research. In the late 1980s some attempts were made to link terrain softening with dust and aeolian processes, though this hypothesis has largely been superseded by more recent observations.

Terrain softening is one of a suite of features seen in the midlatitudes of Mars—also including lobate debris aprons, lineated valley fill, concentric crater fill, latitude dependent mantle, patterned ground, viscous flow features, arcuate ridges, recurring slope lineae, and gullies—whose form and distribution strongly suggest the abundance of ice at the surface.

== Contrast between softened and unsoftened terrain ==
Unsoftened terrain

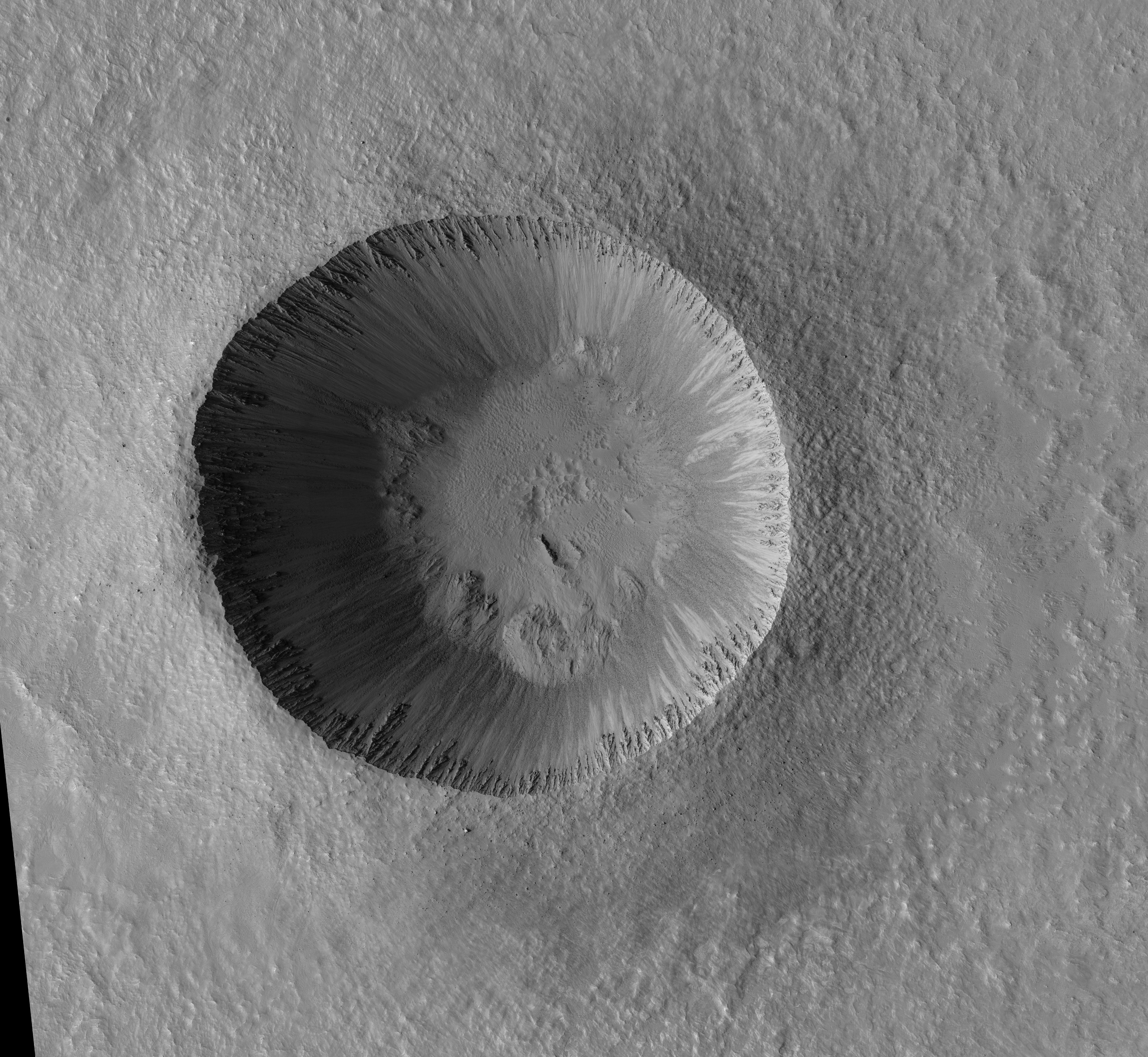
Zumba crater, 29° S

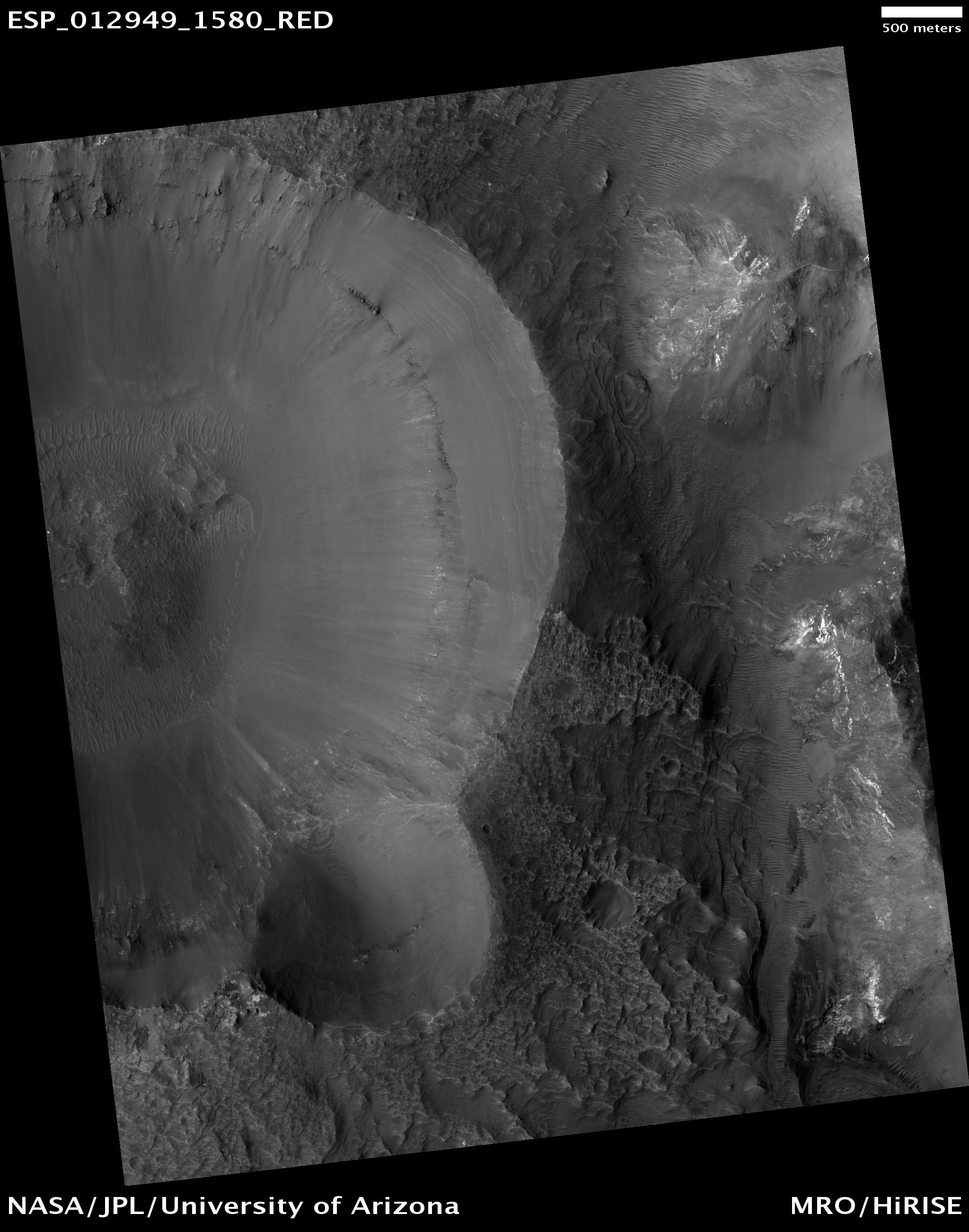
Small craters inset within Saheki crater, 22° S

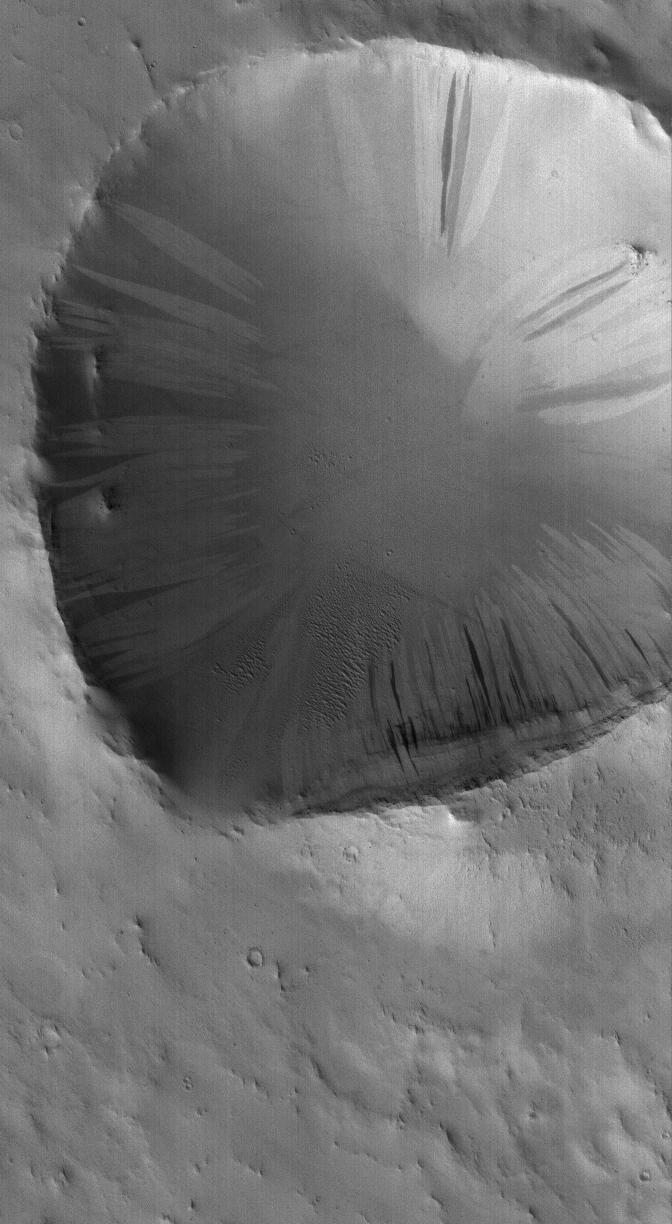
Crater in Arabia Terra, 13° N

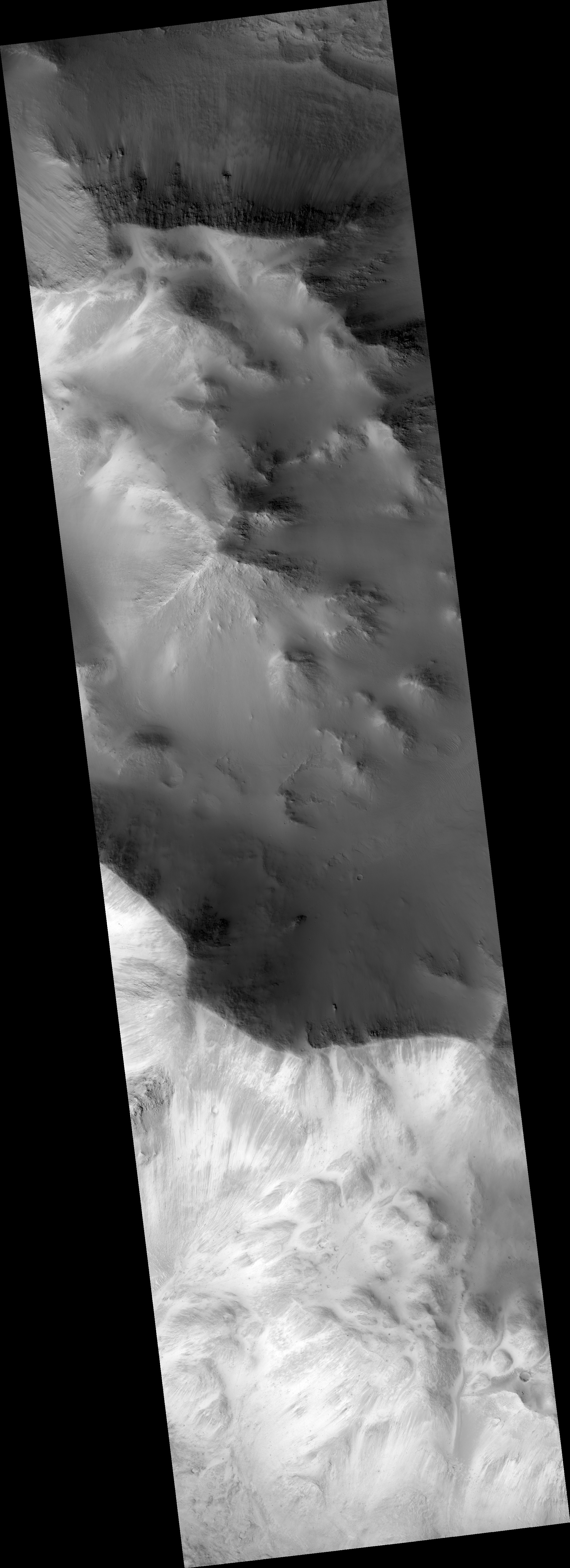
Sharp terrain in Radau crater, 17° N

Softened terrain

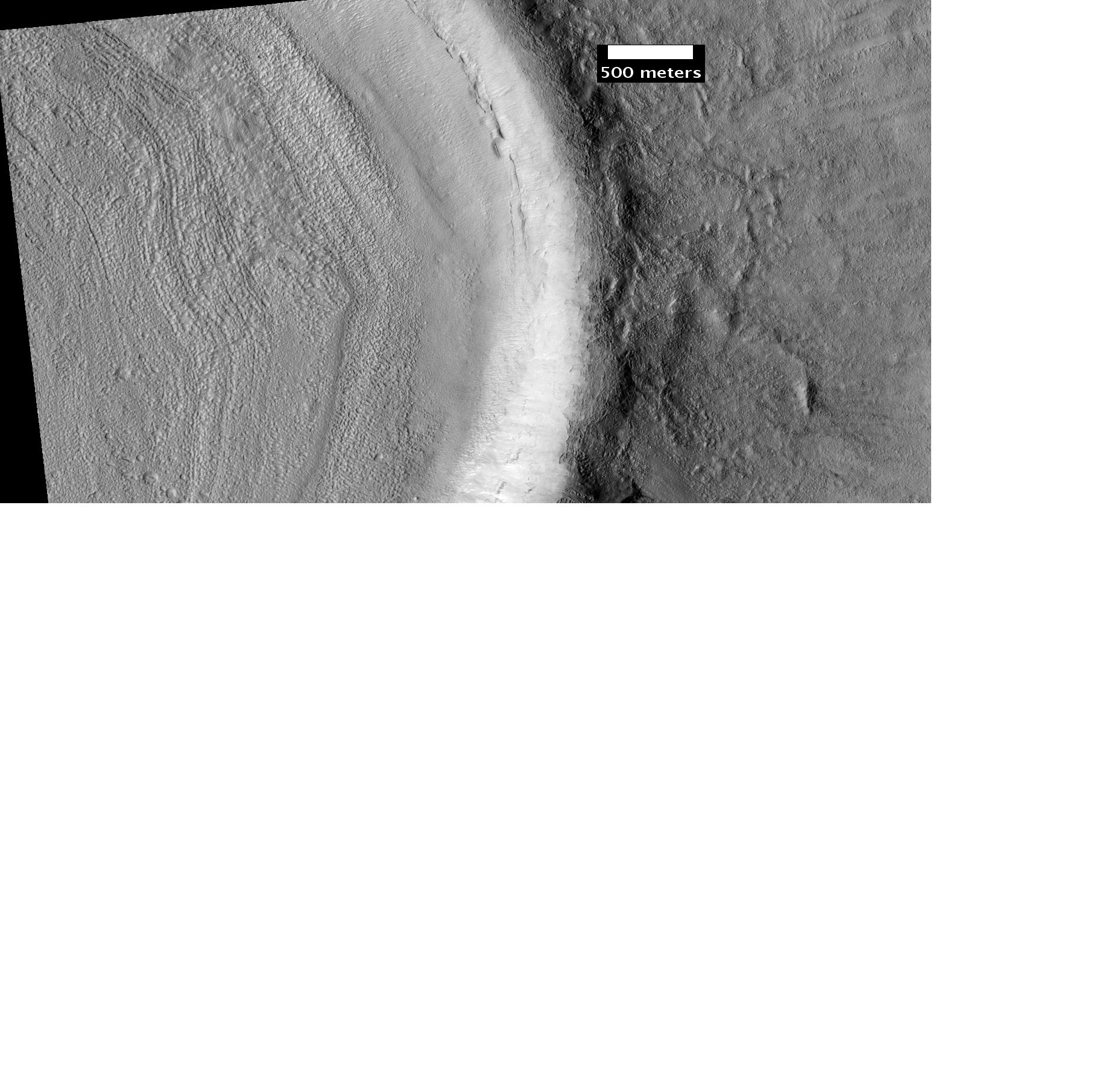
Part of crater rim and concentric crater fill in the Eridania quadrangle, 39° S

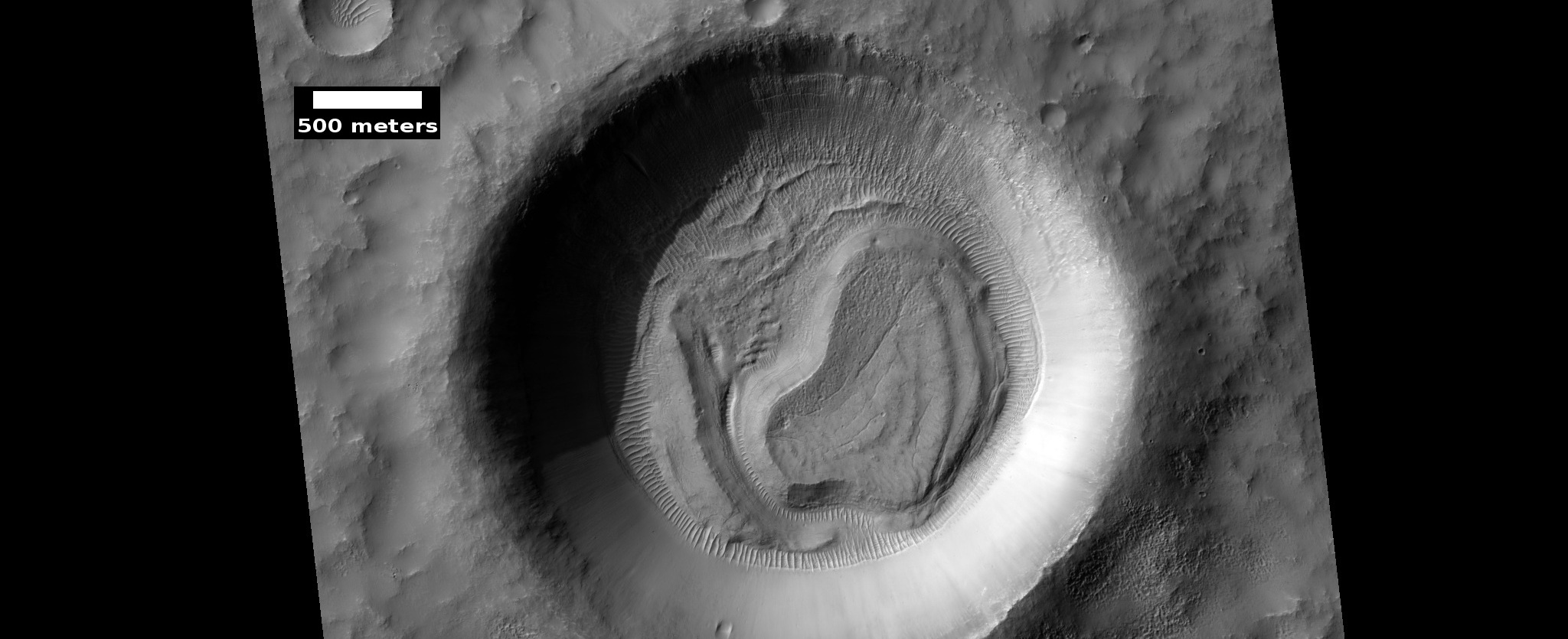
Unnamed crater, 36° S

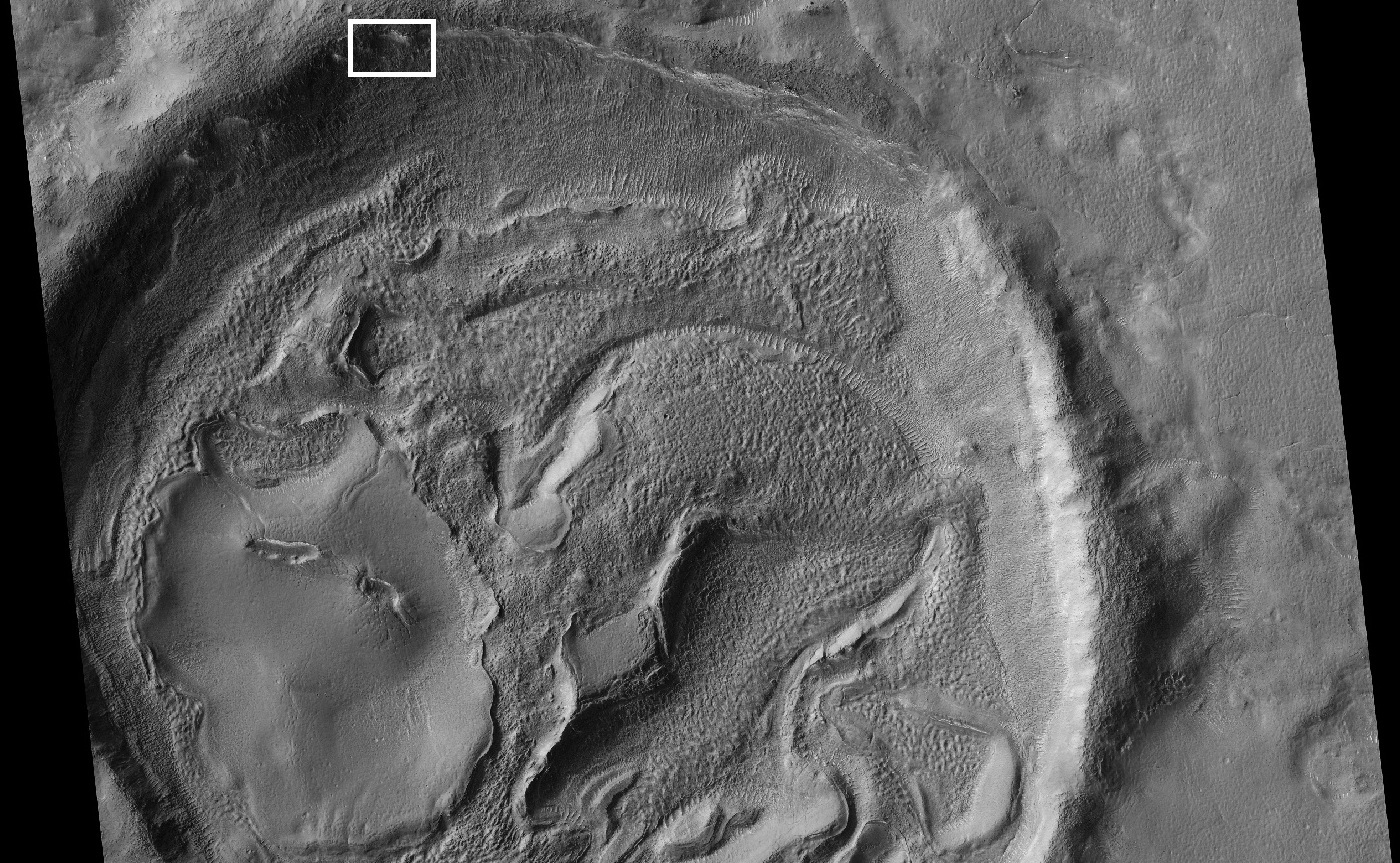
Unnamed crater with concentric crater fill, 41° S

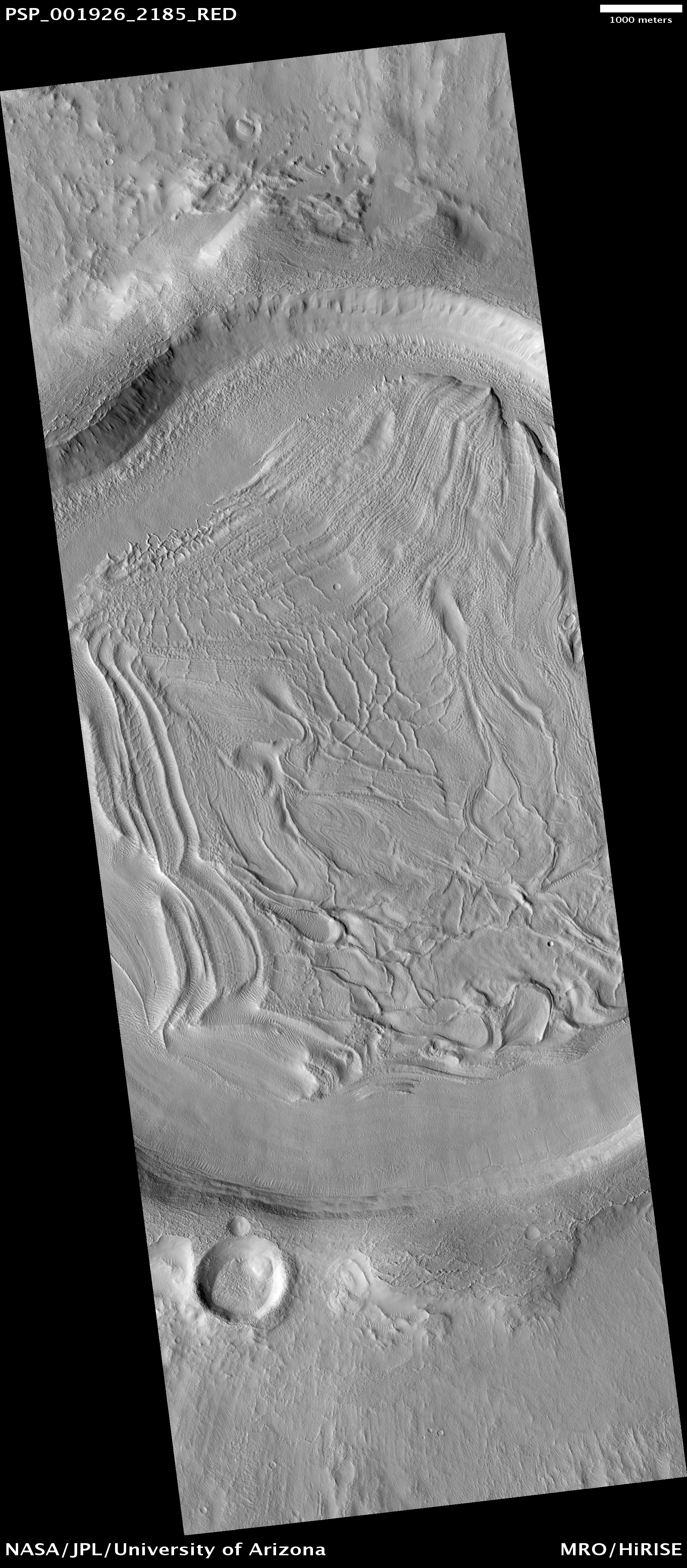
Unnamed crater with concentric crater fill, 38° S

== See also ==
- Climate of Mars – Overview of Martian climate
- Geology of Mars – Scientific study of the surface, crust, and interior of the planet Mars
- Periglaciation – Natural processes associated with freezing and thawing in regions close to glaciers
- Permafrost – Type of soil in frozen state
- Solifluction – Freeze-thaw mass wasting slope processes
- Water on Mars – Study of past and present water on Mars
