= Yuty (crater) =

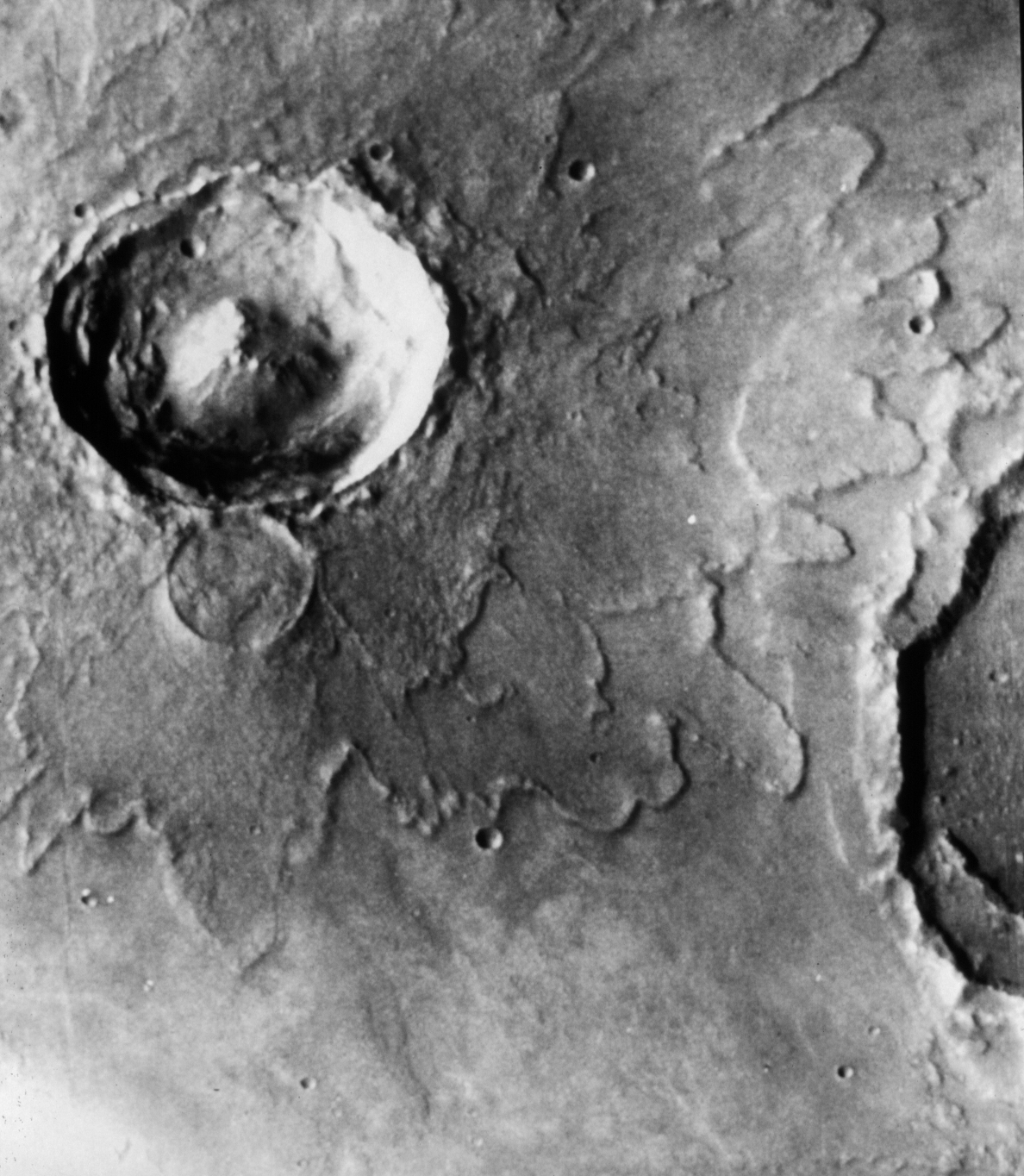
- Yuty seen by the Viking 1 orbiter in 1977
- Planet: Mars
- Region: Tiu Valles
- Coordinates: 22.4°N 34.2°W
- Quadrangle: Oxia Palus
- Diameter: 19.06 km (11.84 mi)
- Eponym: Yuty, Paraguay

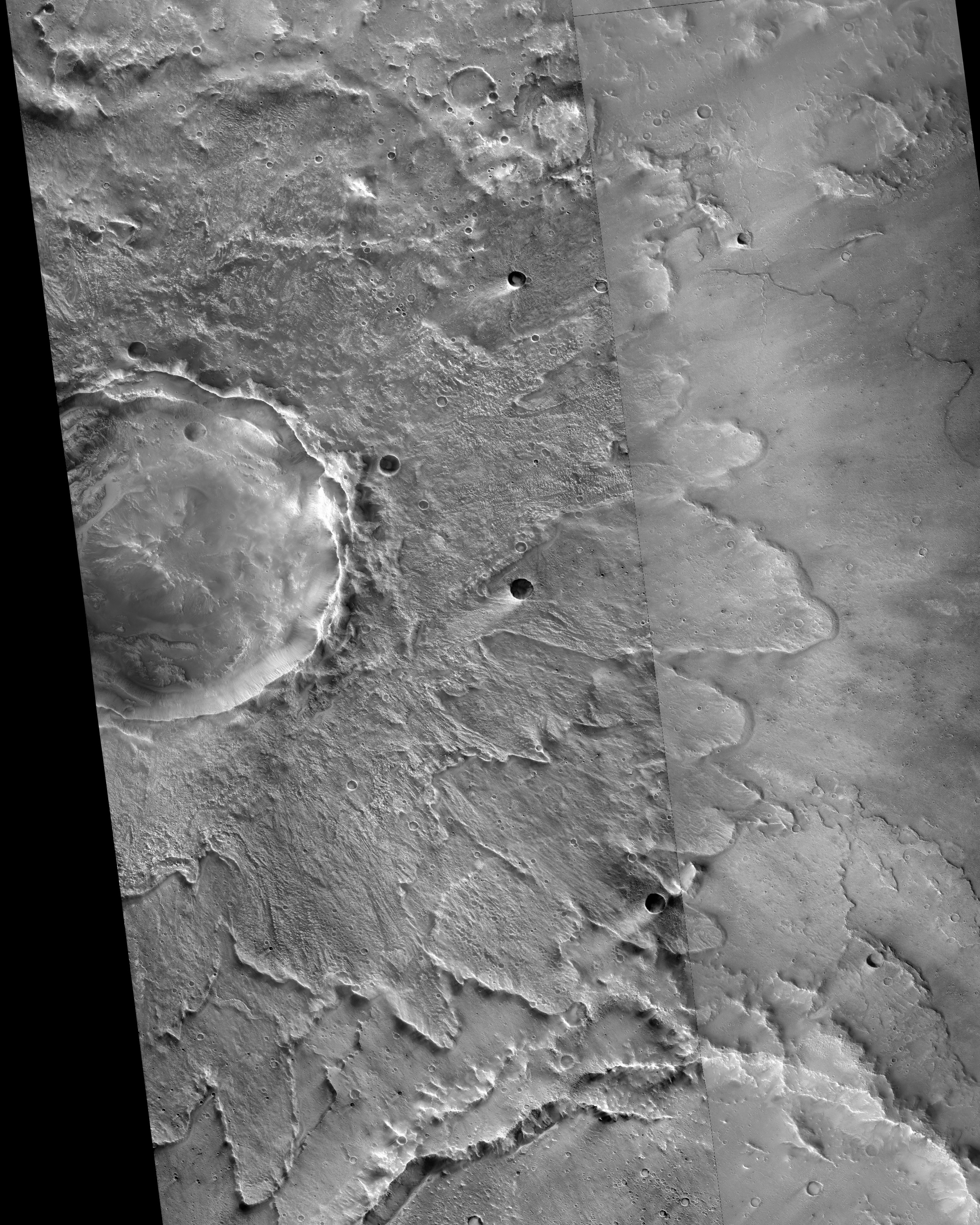
CTX mosaic (MRO)

Yuty is a crater on Mars in Chryse Planitia, named after the town of Yuty in Paraguay. It measures approximately 19 kilometres (12 miles) in diameter, and is surrounded by complex ejecta lobes, which are a distinctive characteristic of Martian impact craters.

== Description ==
Many craters at equatorial and mid-latitudes on Mars have this form of ejecta morphology, which is thought to arise when the impacting object melts ice in the subsurface. Liquid water in the ejected material forms a muddy slurry that flows along the surface, producing the characteristic lobe shapes. The presence of a pre-existing, partially buried crater on Yuty's southwestern rim is evidence that the ejecta is thin.

Yuty is located in the general region of the Viking 1 landing site. It was well photographed by the Viking orbiters in the 1970s, and as a consequence its image appears in many books and articles of the era as a type example of Martian impact crater morphology.

The distinctive lobate ejecta pattern of craters like Yuty gave rise to a confusing terminology among Mars researchers. Sometimes informally called "splosh craters", Yuty-type craters have also been called petal or flower craters and fluidized ejecta craters. More commonly they are called rampart craters because the ejecta lobes terminate in curved ridges or ramparts. In today's preferred terminology, Yuty is described as a multiple-layer ejecta (MLE) rampart crater because its ejecta is deposited in a series of three or more discrete layers. The presence of multiple ejecta layers may reflect impact into multiple layers of ice or a subsurface layer saturated with liquid water. The exact process is still somewhat controversial.

Yuty is a complex crater as opposed to a simple (bowl-shaped) crater. Complex craters are distinguished by having a raised central peak complex and terracing along the inner wall. On Mars, complex crater morphology begins to appear at crater diameters between 5 and 8 km (3.1 and 5.0 mi). The size of the central peak in Yuty is larger than central peaks in comparable craters on other planets. This appears typical of complex craters on Mars and, like the lobate ejecta patterns, may be due to geologic conditions in the subsurface that are unique to Mars (e.g., presence of ice).

== See also ==
- Geology of Mars
- List of craters on Mars
