= Huo Hsing Vallis =

Vallis on Mars

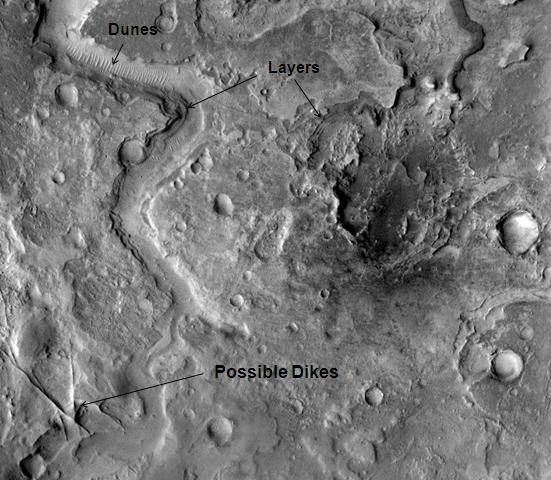
- Dikes in which liquid rock once flowed.
- Coordinates: 30.5°N 293.4°W

Huo Hsing Vallis is an ancient river valley in the Syrtis Major quadrangle of Mars at 30.5° north latitude and 293.4° west longitude. It is about 318 km long and was named after the word for "Mars" in Chinese.

== Dikes ==
Some crater floors in the Syrtis Major area show elongated ridges in a lattice-like pattern. Such patterns are typical of faults and breccia dikes formed as a result of an impact. The ridges are found where there has been enhanced erosion. Pictures on this page show examples of these dikes. Water may flow along faults. The water often carries minerals that serve to cement rock materials thus making them harder. Later when the whole area undergoes erosion the dikes will remain as ridges because they are more resistant to erosion. This discovery may be of great importance for future colonization of Mars because these types of faults and breccia dikes on earth are associated with key mineral resources. Perhaps, when people live on Mars these areas will be mined as they are on earth. These ridges may belong to a class of structures that have been called linear ridge networks. There exact origin is unknown at present.

Huo Hsing Vallis Ridges, as seen by HiRISE. Ridges may be caused by water moving along faults.
