= Deformation bands =

Geological mechanism producing small fault lines

Deformation bands are small faults with very small displacements. In the past, these bands have been called Luder's bands or braided shear fractures. They often precede large faults. They develop in porous rocks, such as sandstone. Material in a deformation band has a much smaller grain size, poorer sorting, and a lower porosity than the original sandstone. They can restrict and/or change the flow of fluids like water and oil. They are common in the Colorado Plateau, where examples occur in the Entrada Sandstone in the San Rafael Swell in Utah.

Deformation bands are present in a variety of porous rock types such as sandstones, limestones, siltstones, poorly welded volcanic tuffs, and breccias. The cataclastic and compactional bands often form seals and prevent the flow of groundwater or oil. In their formation grains shift their packing and are crushed.

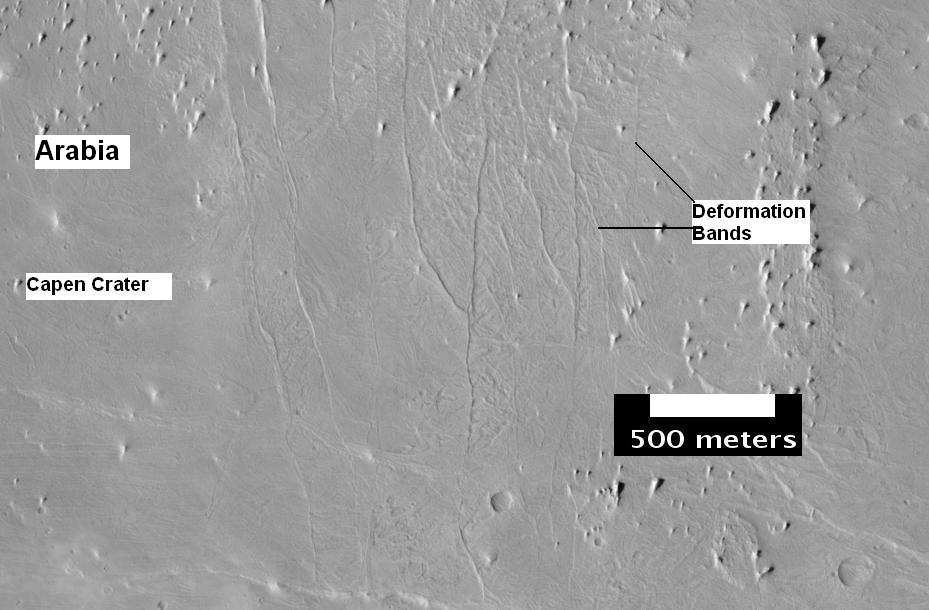
The group of lines running up and down in the image are believed to be deformation bands. They can be thought of as small faults.

The Mars Reconnaissance Orbiter showed deformation bands in Capen Crater, located in the Arabia quadrangle. The bands represent failure by localized frictional sliding.
