= Arabia quadrangle =

Map of Mars

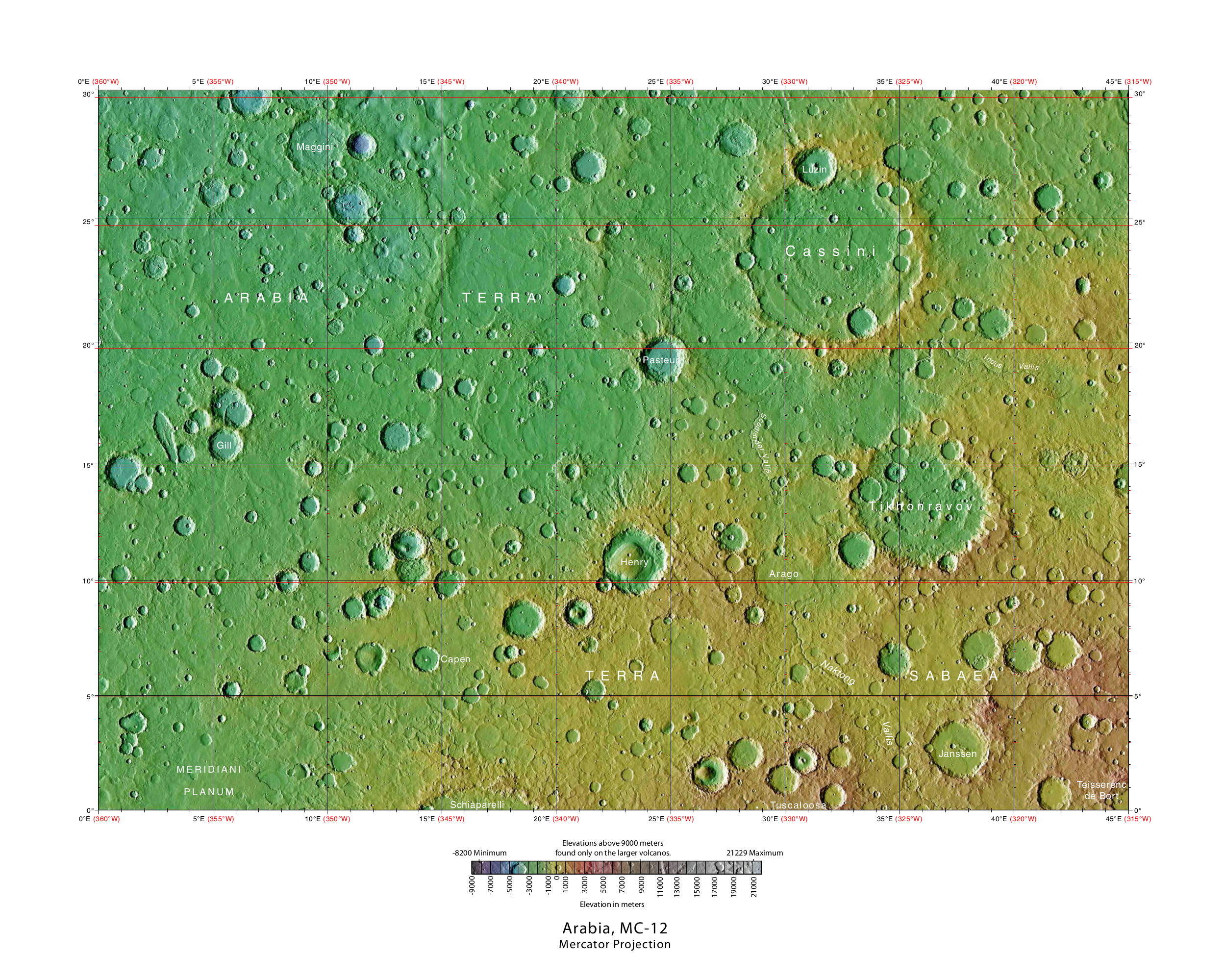
- Map of Arabia quadrangle from Mars Orbiter Laser Altimeter (MOLA) data. The highest elevations are red and the lowest are blue.
- Coordinates: 15°N 337.5°W

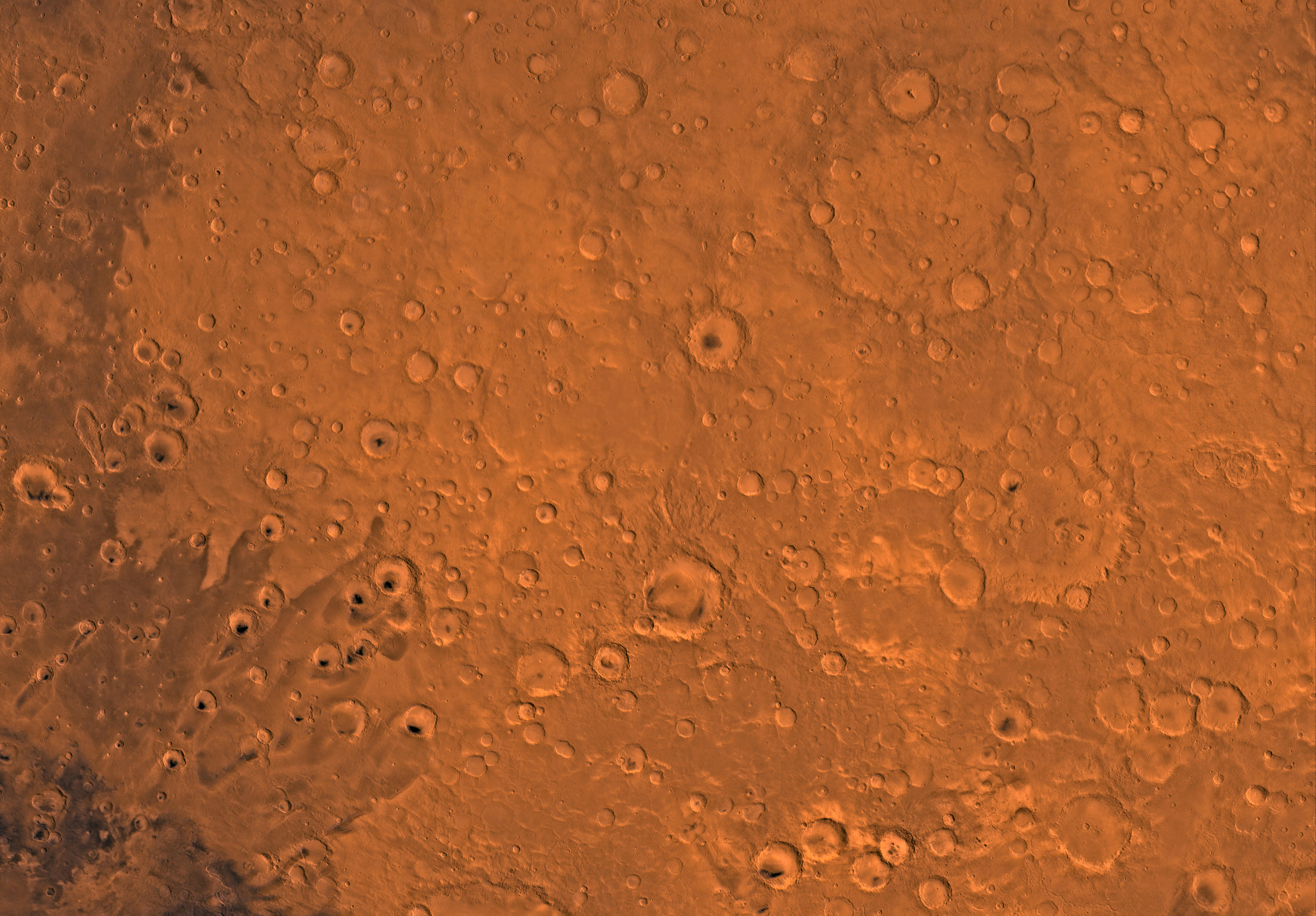
Image of the Arabia Quadrangle (MC-12). The region is dominated with heavily cratered highlands; the northeast part contains Cassini Crater.

The Arabia quadrangle is one of a series of 30 quadrangle maps of Mars used by the United States Geological Survey (USGS) Astrogeology Research Program. The Arabia quadrangle is also referred to as MC-12 (Mars Chart-12).

The quadrangle contains part of the classic area of Mars known as Arabia. It also contains a part of Terra Sabaea and a small part of Meridiani Planum. It lies on the boundary between the young northern plains and the old southern highlands. The quadrangle covers the area from 315° to 360° west longitude and 0° to 30° north latitude.

== Description ==
The surface of the Arabia quadrangle appears to be very old because it has a high density of craters, but it is not near as high in elevation as typical old surfaces. On Mars the oldest areas contain the most craters; the oldest period is called Noachian after the quadrangle Noachis. The Arabia area contains many buttes and ridges. Some believe that during certain climate changes an ice-dust layer was deposited; later, parts were eroded to form buttes. Some outflow channels are found in Arabia, namely Naktong Vallis, Locras Valles, Indus Vallis, Scamander Vallis, and Cusus Valles.

This area is one of the dustest on the planet. Dust is often 20 meters deep with some places covered with 250 meters of dust.

== Layers ==
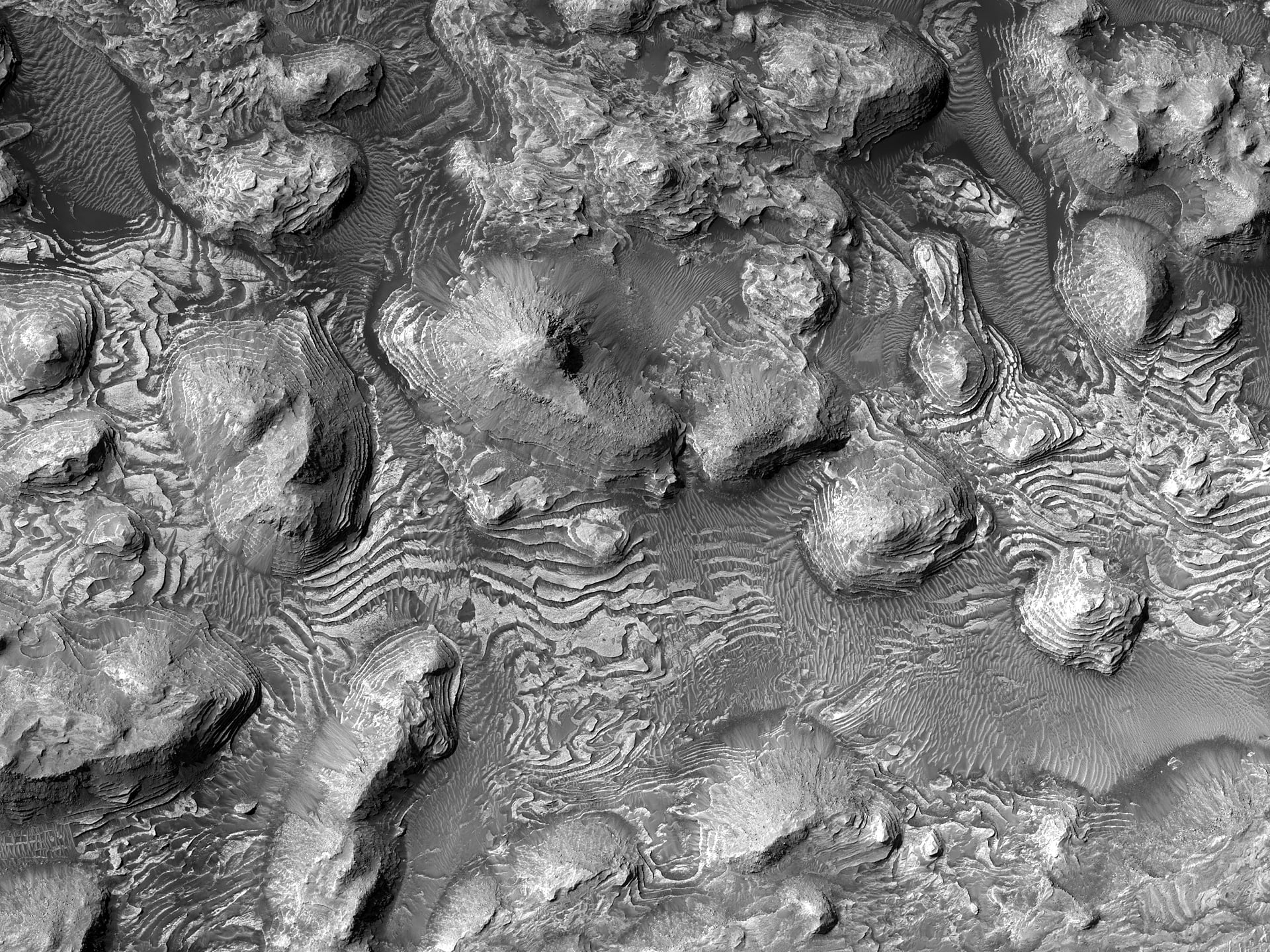
Layers and faults in Arabia quadrangle

Many places in Arabia are shaped into layers. The layers can be a few meters thick or tens of meters thick. Recent research on these layers by scientists at California Institute of Technology (Caltech) suggest that ancient climate change on Mars caused by regular variation in the planet's tilt, or obliquity may have caused the patterns in the layers. On Earth, similar changes (astronomical forcing) of climate results in ice-age cycles.

A recent study of layers in craters in western Arabia revealed much about the history of the layers. Although the craters in this study are just outside the boundary for the Arabia quadrangle the findings would probably apply to the Arabia quadrangle as well. The thickness of each layer may average less than 4 meters in one crater, but 20 meters in another. The pattern of layers measured in Becquerel crater, suggests that each layer was formed over a period of about 100,000 years. Moreover, every 10 layers were bundled together into larger units. The 10-layer pattern is repeated at least 10 times. So every 10-layer pattern took one-million years to form.

The tilt of the Earth's axis changes by only a little more than 2 degrees; it is stabilized by the relatively large mass of the Moon. In contrast Mars's tilt varies by tens of degrees. When the tilt (or obliquity) is low, the poles are the coldest places on the planet, while the equator is the warmest—as on Earth. This causes gases in the atmosphere, like water and carbon dioxide, to migrate pole ward, where they freeze. When the obliquity is higher, the poles receive more sunlight, causing those materials to migrate away. When carbon dioxide moves from the poles, the atmospheric pressure increases, maybe causing a difference in the ability of winds to transport and deposit sand. Also, with more water in the atmosphere sand grains may stick and cement together to form layers. This study of the thickness of layers was done using stereo topographic maps obtained by processing data from the high-resolution camera onboard NASA's Mars Reconnaissance Orbiter.

Recent research leads scientists to believe that some of the craters in Arabia may have held huge lakes. Cassini Crater and Tikonravov Crater probably once were full of water since their rims seem to have been breached by water. Both inflow and outflow channels have been observed on their rims. Each of these lakes would have contained more water than Earth's Lake Baikal, our largest freshwater lake by volume. The watersheds for lakes in Arabia seem to be too small to gather enough water by precipitation alone; therefore it is thought that much of their water came from groundwater.

Another group of researchers proposed groundwater with dissolved minerals came to the surface, in and later around craters, and helped to form layers by adding minerals (especially sulfate) and cementing sediments. Upon close examination, Arabia layers appear to have a slight tilt. This tilt supports formation with the action of a rising water table. A water table generally follows the topography. Since the layers slope slightly down toward the northwest, the layers may have been created by groundwater, rather than a single large sea that has been suggested.

This hypothesis is supported by a groundwater model and by sulfates discovered in a wide area. At first, by examining surface materials with the Opportunity rover, scientists discovered that groundwater had repeatedly risen and deposited sulfates. Later studies with instruments on board the Mars Reconnaissance Orbiter showed that the same kinds of materials exist in a large area that included Arabia.

== Light-toned materials ==
Certain areas of Mars show ground that has a much lighter-tone than most other areas. Much of the surface of Mars is dark because of extensive flows of the dark lava rock basalt. Studies with spectroscopes from orbit have shown that many light-toned areas contain hydrated minerals, and/or clay minerals. That means that water was once there in order to produce these substances. In short, light-toned materials are markers for the past presence of water.

== Craters ==
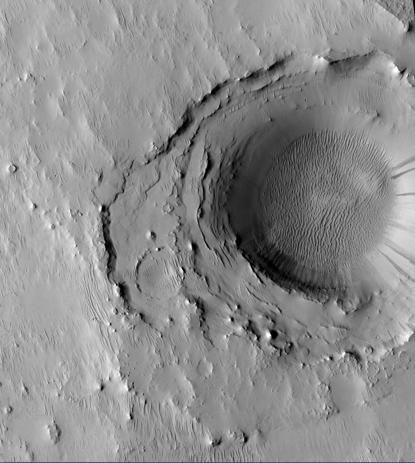
Crater in the middle of Cassini, as seen by HiRISE. Layers may have been deposited under water since it is believed that Cassini once held a giant lake.

Impact craters generally have a rim with ejecta around them, in contrast volcanic craters usually do not have a rim or ejecta deposits. As craters get larger (greater than 10 km in diameter) they usually have a central peak. The peak is caused by a rebound of the crater floor following the impact. Sometimes craters display layers. Since the collision that produces a crater is like a powerful explosion, rocks from deep underground are tossed unto the surface. Hence, craters can show us what lies deep under the surface.

Some craters in Arabia are classified as pedestal craters. A pedestal crater is a crater with its ejecta sitting above the surrounding terrain and thereby forming a raised platform. They form when an impact crater ejects material which forms an erosion resistant layer, thus protecting the immediate area from erosion. As a result of this hard covering, the crater and its ejecta become elevated, as erosion removes the softer material beyond the ejecta. Some pedestals have been accurately measured to be hundreds of meters above the surrounding area. This means that hundreds of meters of material were eroded away. Pedestal craters were first observed during the Mariner missions.

Researchers believe over 200 new craters are formed each year on Mars, based on study of years of HiRISE images.

== Possible methane ==
One study with the Planetary Fourier Spectrometer in the Mars Express spacecraft found possible methane in three areas of Mars, one of which was in Arabia. One possible source of methane is from the metabolism of living bacteria. However, a recent study indicates that to match the observations of methane, there must be something that quickly destroys the gas, otherwise it would be spread all through the atmosphere instead of being concentrated in just a few locations. There may be something in the soil that oxidizes the gas before it has a chance to spread. If this is so, that same chemical would destroy organic compounds, thus life would be very difficult on Mars.

== Deformation bands ==
The Mars Reconnaissance Orbiter showed deformation bands in Capen Crater, located in the Arabia quadrangle. Deformation bands are small faults with very small displacements. They often proceed large faults. They develop in porous rocks, like sandstone. They can restrict and/or change the flow of fluids like water and oil. They are common in the Colorado Plateau. Good examples form in the Entrada Sandstone in the San Rafael Swell in Utah. The bands represent failure by localized frictional sliding. The bands on Mars are a few meters wide and up to a few kilometers long. They are caused by the compression or stretching of underground layers. Erosion of overlying layers make them visible at the surface. Capen Crater was unnamed before the discovery of deformation bands. It was named for Charles Capen, who studied Mars at JPL's Table Mountain Observatory in California and at Lowell Observatory in Arizona.

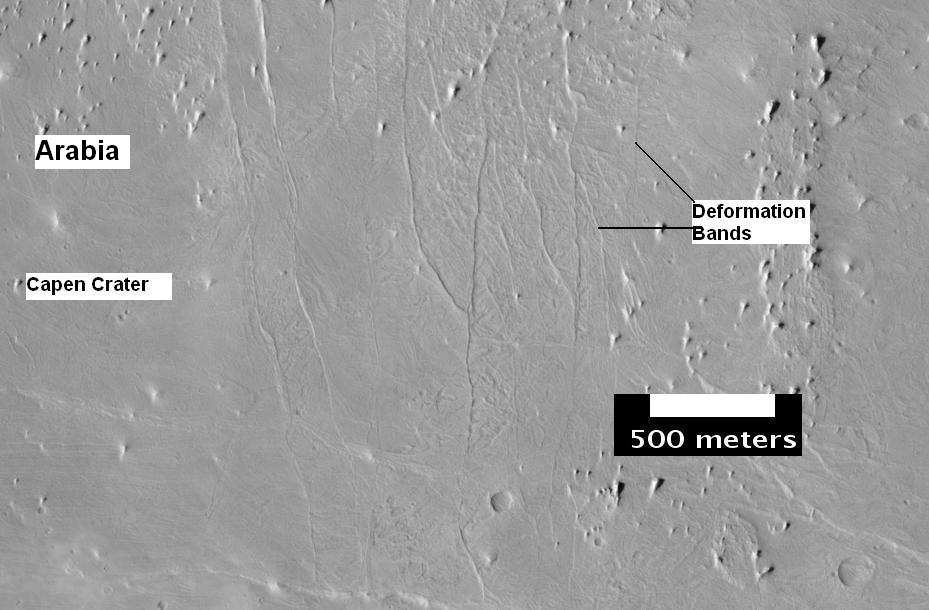
The group of lines running up and down in the image are believed to be deformation bands. They can be thought of as small faults.

== Geological history ==
Recent studies, reported in the journal Icarus, have suggested that the area underwent several phases in its formation:

- A large basin, maybe from an impact, was produced early in Martian history. It was so early that Mars still had a magnetic field generated by movements in a liquid core. Present day Arabia possesses a remnant magnetism from that ancient era.
- Sediments flowed into the basin. Water entered the basin.
- Because Tharsis, on the other side of Mars, became so massive, the area around Arabia was pushed out. As it bulged upward, there was increased erosion which exposed old layers. When portions of a planet that can be subject to erosion rise, there is greatly increased erosion; Earth's Grand Canyon became very deep because it was eroded into a high plateau.
- Over the following 4 billion years, the area was modified by various geological processes. Central peaks and ejecta shapes indicate that parts of Arabia are still water enriched.

== Dark slope streaks ==
Streaks are common on Mars. They occur on steep slopes of craters, troughs, and valleys. The streaks are dark at first. They get lighter with age. Sometimes they start in a tiny spot, then spread out and go for hundreds of meters. They have been seen to travel around obstacles, like boulders. It is believed that they are avalanches of bright dust that expose a darker underlying layer. However, several ideas have been advanced to explain them. Some involve water or even the growth of organisms. Streaks appear in areas covered with dust. Much of the Martian surface is covered with dust. Fine dust settles out of the atmosphere covering everything. We know a lot about this dust because the solar panels of the Mars Rovers get covered with dust, thus reducing the electrical energy. The power of the Rovers has been restored many times by the wind, in the form of dust devils, cleaning the panels and boosting the power. So, we know that dust settles from the atmosphere then returns over and over. Dust storms are frequent, especially when the spring season begins in the southern hemisphere. At that time, Mars is 40% closer to the Sun. The orbit of Mars is much more elliptical than the Earth's. That is the difference between the farthest point from the Sun and the closest point to the Sun is very great for Mars, but only a slight amount for the Earth. Also, every few years, the entire planet is engulfed in global dust storms. When NASA's Mariner 9 craft arrived there, nothing could be seen through the dust storm. Other global dust storms have also been observed, since that time.

Research, published in January 2012 in Icarus, found that dark streaks were initiated by airblasts from meteorites traveling at supersonic speeds. The team of scientists was led by Kaylan Burleigh, an undergraduate at the University of Arizona. After counting some 65,000 dark streaks around the impact site of a group of five new craters, patterns emerged. The number of streaks was greatest closer to the impact site. So, the impact somehow probably caused the streaks. Also, the distribution of the streaks formed a pattern with two wings extending from the impact site. The curved wings resembled scimitars, curved knives. This pattern suggests that an interaction of airblasts from the group of meteorites shook dust loose enough to start dust avalanches that formed the many dark streaks. At first it was thought that the shaking of the ground from the impact caused the dust avalanches, but if that was the case the dark streaks would have been arranged symmetrically around the impacts, rather than being concentrated into curved shapes.

== Linear ridge networks ==
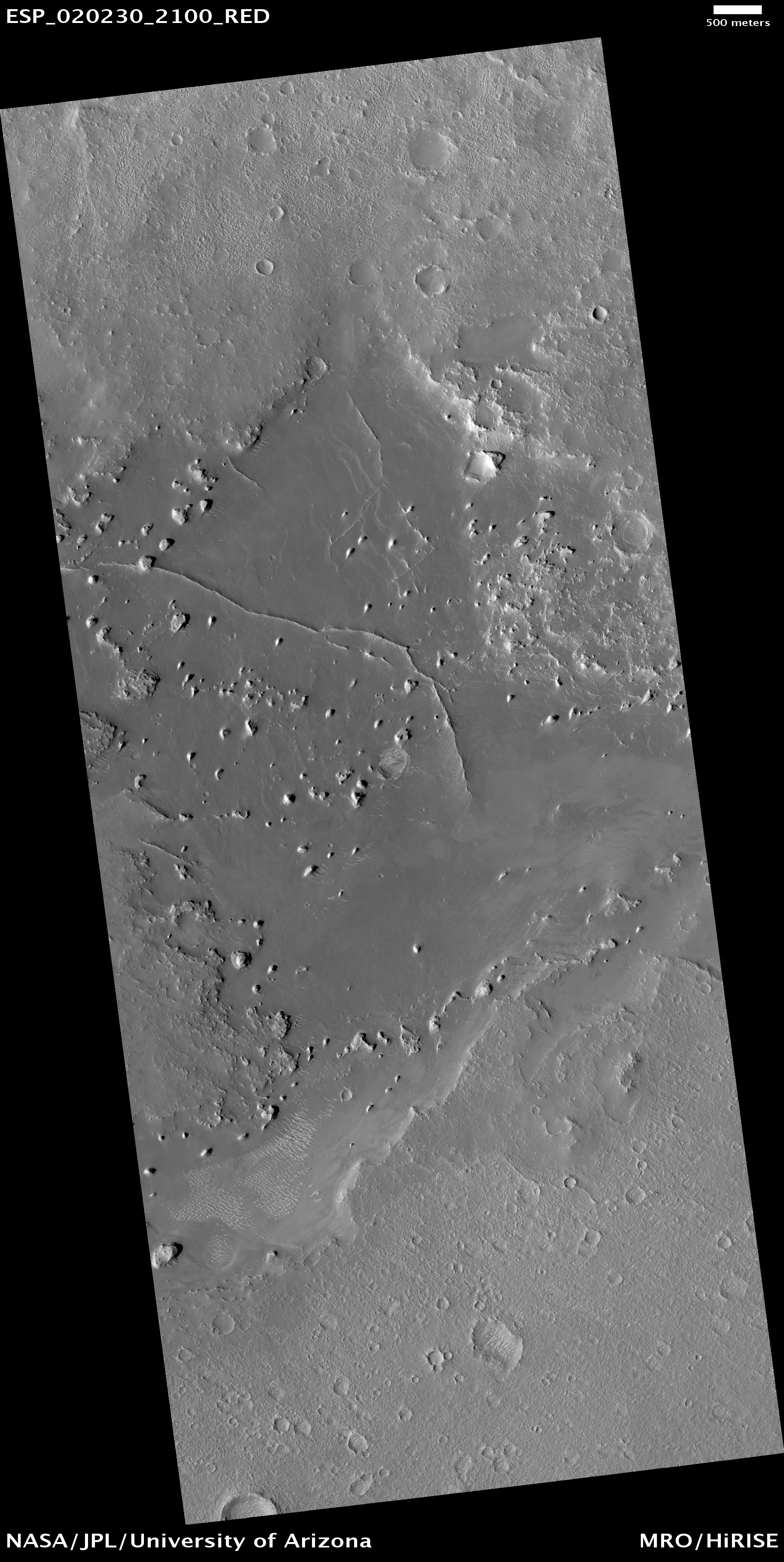
Dikes in Arabia, as seen by HiRISE, under the HiWish program. Scale bar is 500 meters.

Linear ridge networks are found in various places on Mars in and around craters. Ridges often appear as mostly straight segments that intersect in a lattice-like manner. They are hundreds of meters long, tens of meters high, and several meters wide. It is thought that impacts created fractures in the surface, these fractures later acted as channels for fluids. Fluids cemented the structures. With the passage of time, surrounding material was eroded away, thereby leaving hard ridges behind. Since the ridges occur in locations with clay, these formations could serve as a marker for clay which requires water for its formation. Water here could have supported past life in these locations. Clay may also preserve fossils or other traces of past life.

== See also ==
- Climate of Mars
- Dark slope streak
- Equatorial layered deposits
- Geology of Mars
- Groundwater on Mars
- HiRISE
- Linear ridge networks
- List of quadrangles on Mars
- Mars Orbiter Camera
- Pedestal craters
- Vallis
- Water on Mars

MC-01 Mare Boreum (features)
| MC-02 Diacria (features) | | MC-03 Arcadia (features) | MC-04 Acidalium (features) | MC-05 Ismenius Lacus (features) | | MC-06 Casius (features) | MC-07 Cebrenia (features) |
| MC-08 Amazonis (features) | MC-09 Tharsis (features) | MC-10 Lunae Palus (features) | MC-11 Oxia Palus (features) | MC-12 Arabia (features) | MC-13 Syrtis Major (features) | MC-14 Amenthes (features) | MC-15 Elysium (features) |
| MC-16 Memnonia (features) | MC-17 Phoenicis Lacus (features) | MC-18 Coprates (features) | MC-19 Margaritifer Sinus (features) | MC-20 Sinus Sabaeus (features) | MC-21 Iapygia (features) | MC-22 Mare Tyrrhenum (features) | MC-23 Aeolis (features) |
| MC-24 Phaethontis (features) | | MC-25 Thaumasia (features) | MC-26 Argyre (features) | MC-27 Noachis (features) | | MC-28 Hellas (features) | MC-29 Eridania (features) |
MC-30 Mare Australe (features)
