= Linear ridge networks =

Linear ridge networks are found in various places on Mars, especially in and around craters. These features have also been called "polygonal ridge networks", "boxwork ridges", and "reticulate ridges". Ridges often appear as mostly straight segments that intersect in a lattice-like manner. They are hundreds of meters long, tens of meters high, and several meters wide. It is thought that impacts created fractures in the surface, these fractures later acted as channels for fluids. Fluids cemented the structures. With the passage of time, surrounding material was eroded away, thereby leaving hard ridges behind. It is reasonable to think that on Mars impacts broke the ground with cracks since faults are often formed in impact craters on Earth. One could guess that these ridge networks were dikes, but dikes would go more or less in the same direction, as compared to these ridges that have a large variety of orientations. Since the ridges occur in locations with clay, these formations could serve as a marker for clay which requires water for its formation. Water here could have supported past life in these locations. Clay may also preserve fossils or other traces of past life.

These ridges could be formed by large impacts that produced fractures, faults, or dikes made up of melted rock and/or crushed rock (breccia). One formation mechanism proposed by Quinn and Ehlmann in 2017 was that sediment was deposited and eventually the sediment underwent diagenesis which caused a loss of volume and fractures. After erosion exposed the fractures, they were filled with minerals possibly by acid-sulfate fluids. More erosion removed softer materials and left the more resistant ridges behind. If the impact-caused dike is made of purely melted rock from the heat of the impact, it is called a pseudotachylite . Also, hydrothermalism may have been involved due to the heat generated during impacts. Strong evidence for hydrothermalism was reported by a team of researchers studying Auki Crater. This crater contains ridges that may have been produced after fractures formed with an impact. Using instruments on the Mars Reconnaissance Orbiter they found the minerals smectite, silica, zeolite, serpentine, carbonate, and chlorite that are common in impact-induced hydrothermal systems on Earth. Other evidence of post-impact hydrothermal systems on Mars from other scientists who studied other Martian craters.

Because ridges seem to be found in older crust only, it is believed that they occurred early in the history of Mars when there were more and larger asteroids striking the planet. These early impacts may have caused the early crust to be full of interconnected channels. These networks have been found many regions of Mars including in Arabia Terra (Arabia quadrangle), northern Meridiani Planum, Solis Planum, Noachis Terra (Noachis quadrangle), Atlantis Chaos, and Nepenthes Mensa (Mare Tyrrhenum quadrangle).

A somewhat different ridge formation has been discovered in the Eastern Medusae Fossae Formation; these dark ridges can be 50 meters in height and erode into dark boulders. It has been suggested that there are from lava filling fractures in the Medusae Fossae Formation which is surrounded by lava flows.

== Linear ridge networks in Mare Tyrrhenum quadrangle ==
Some of these may be from hydrothermal systems produced after an impact.

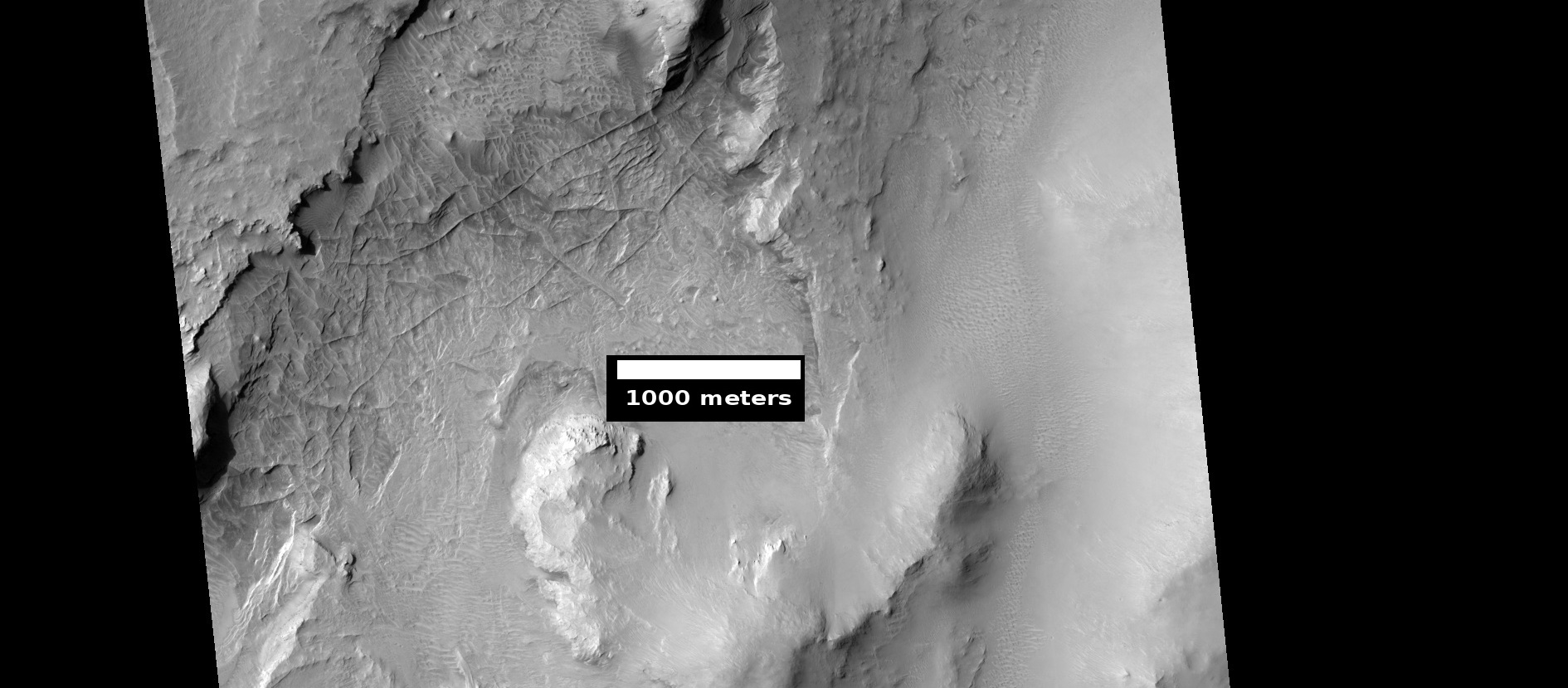
Linear ridge network, as seen by HiRISE under HiWish program

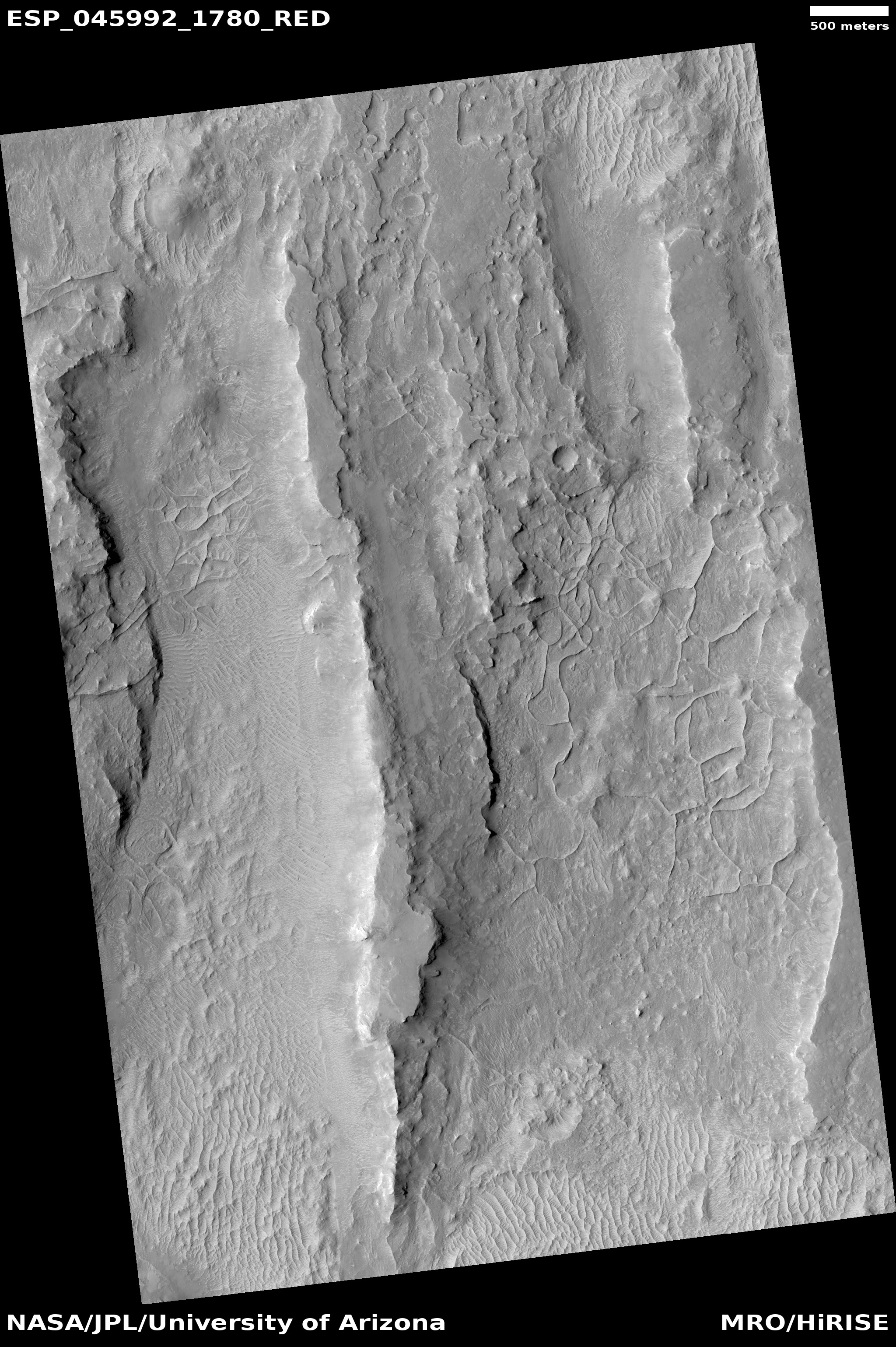
Wide view of several groups of linear ridges, as seen by HiRISE under HiWish program

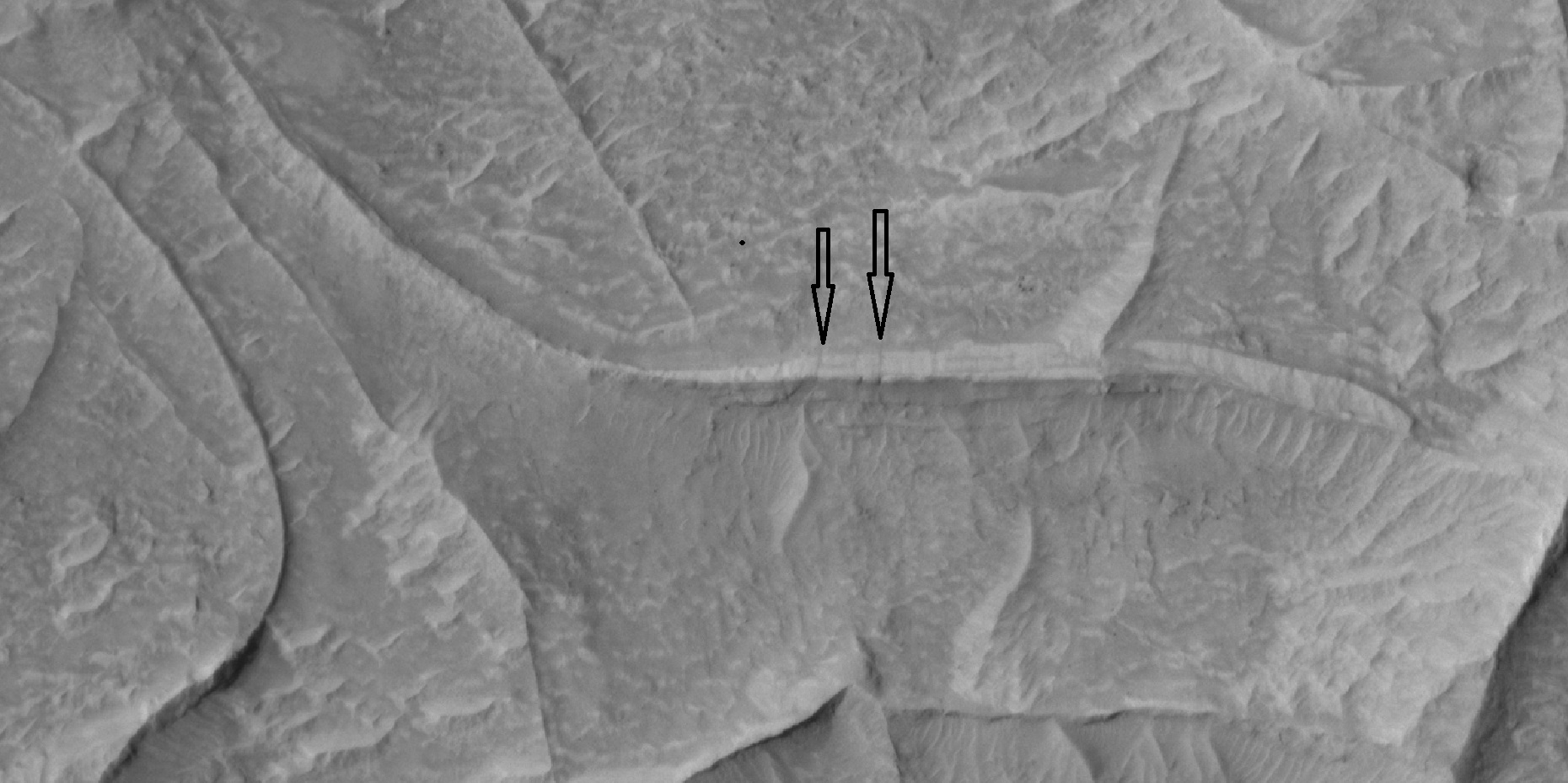
Close view of ridges, from a previous image, as seen by HiRISE under HiWish program. Arrows indicate fractures in ridge

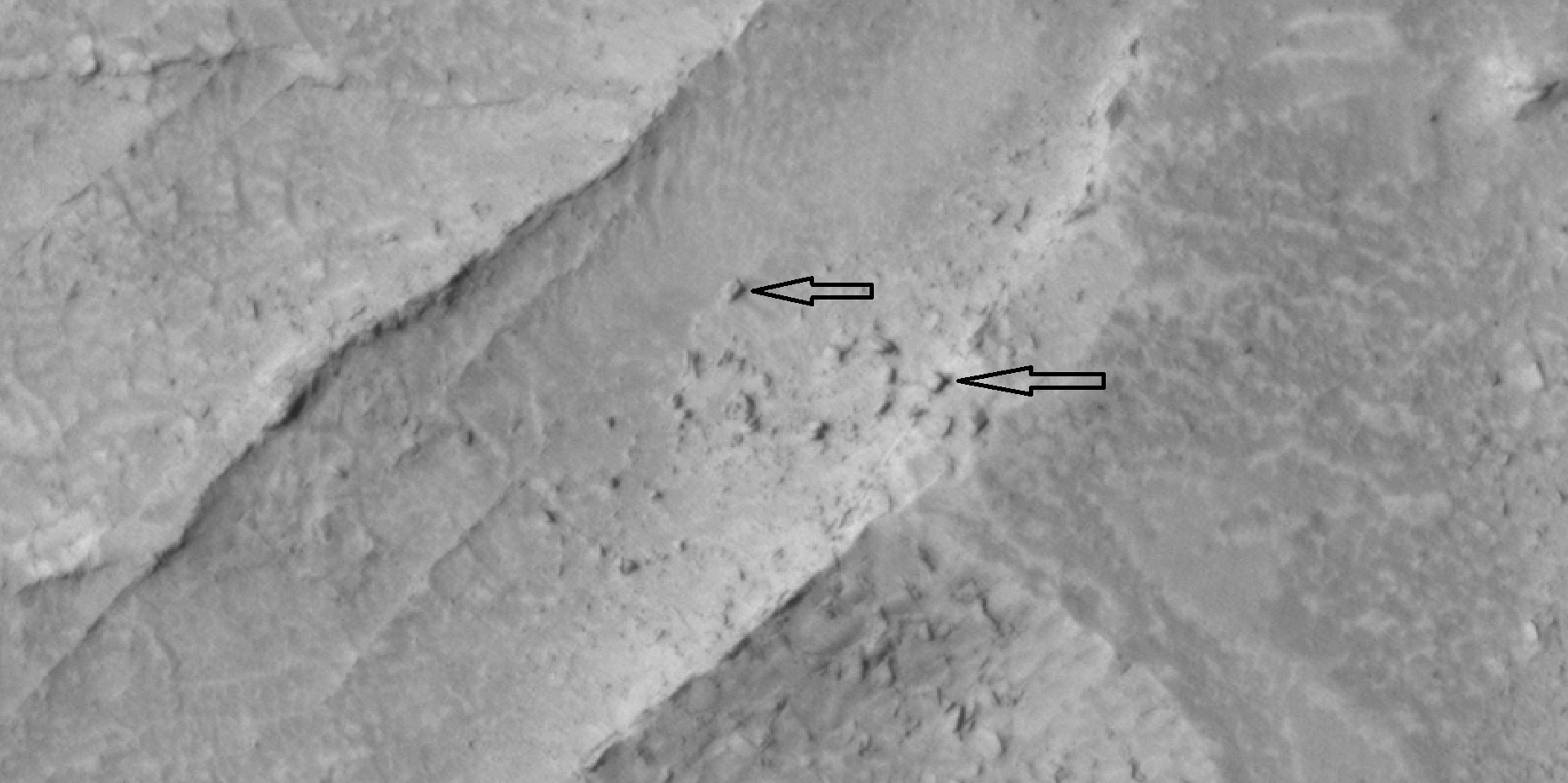
Blocks probably formed after fracturing in ridges, as seen by HiRISE under HiWish program

== Linear ridge networks in Casius quadrangle ==
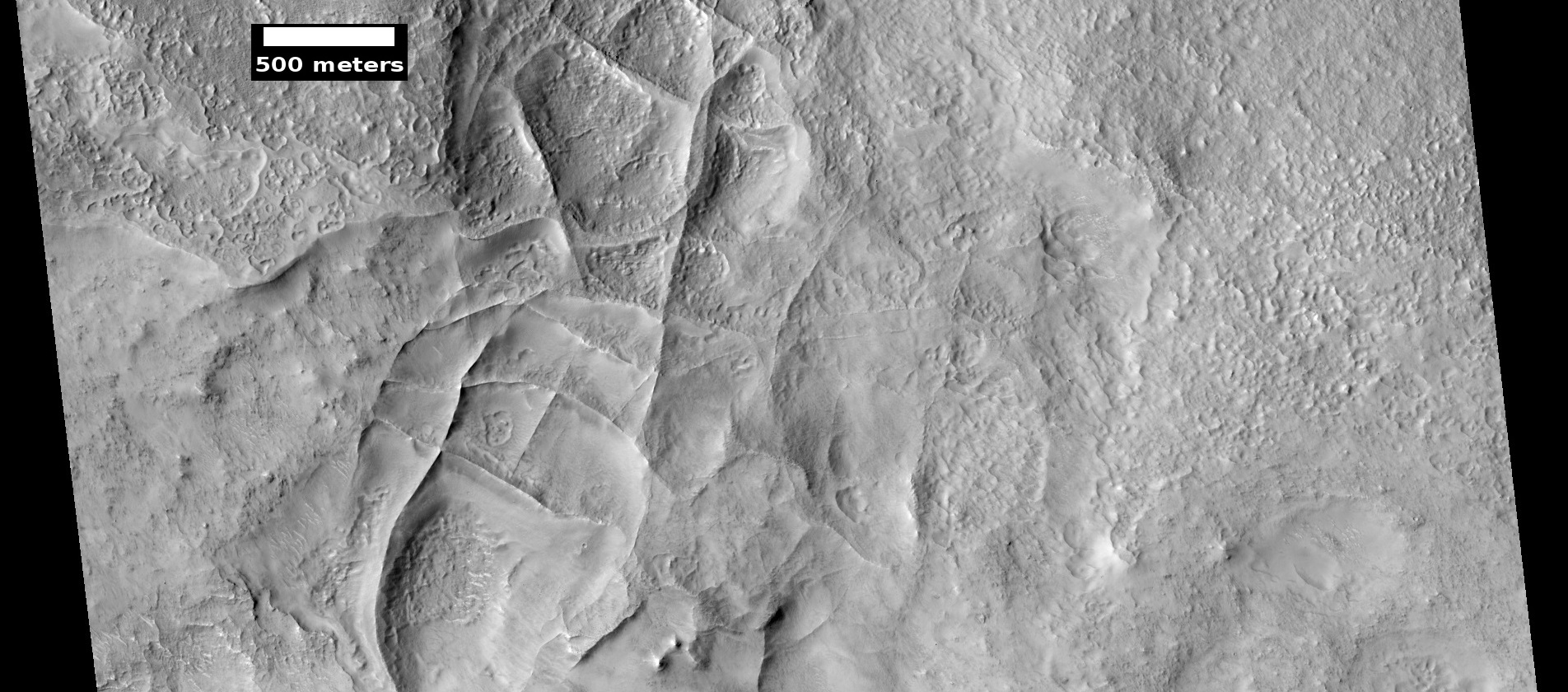
Network of ridges, as seen by HiRISE under HiWish program. Ridges may be formed in various ways.

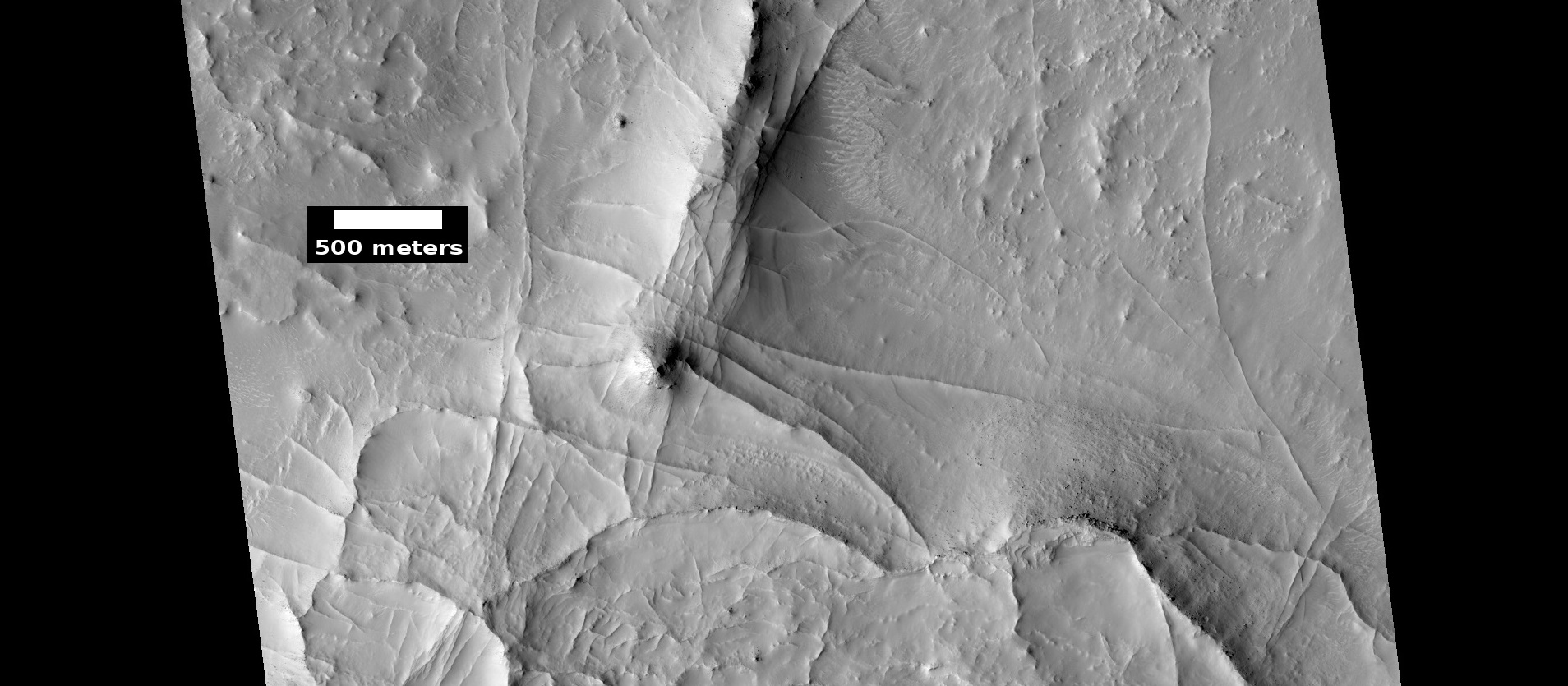
Linear ridge network, as seen by HiRISE under HiWish program
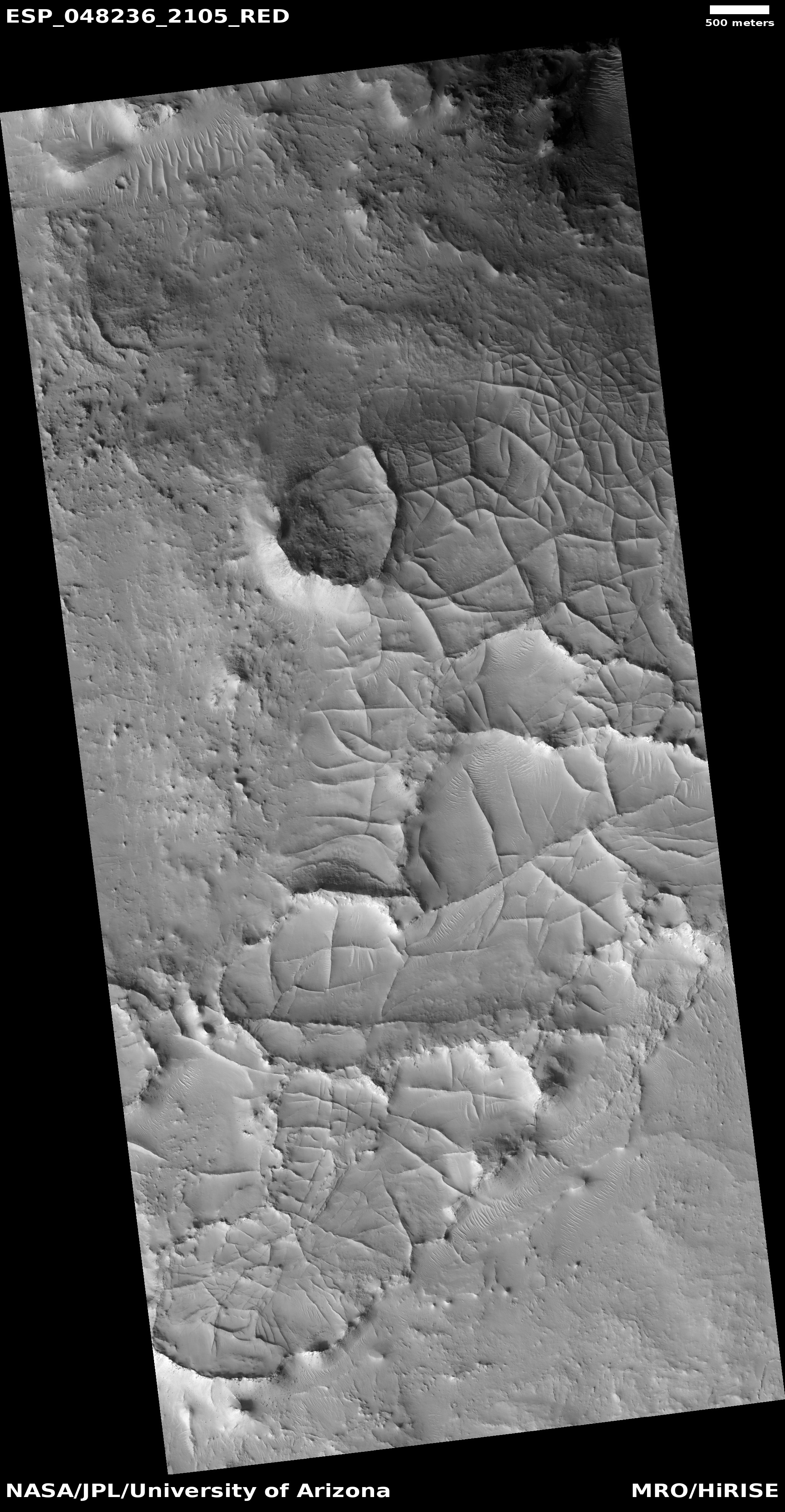
Wide view of network of ridges, as seen by HiRISE under HiWish program. Portions of this image are enlarged in following images.

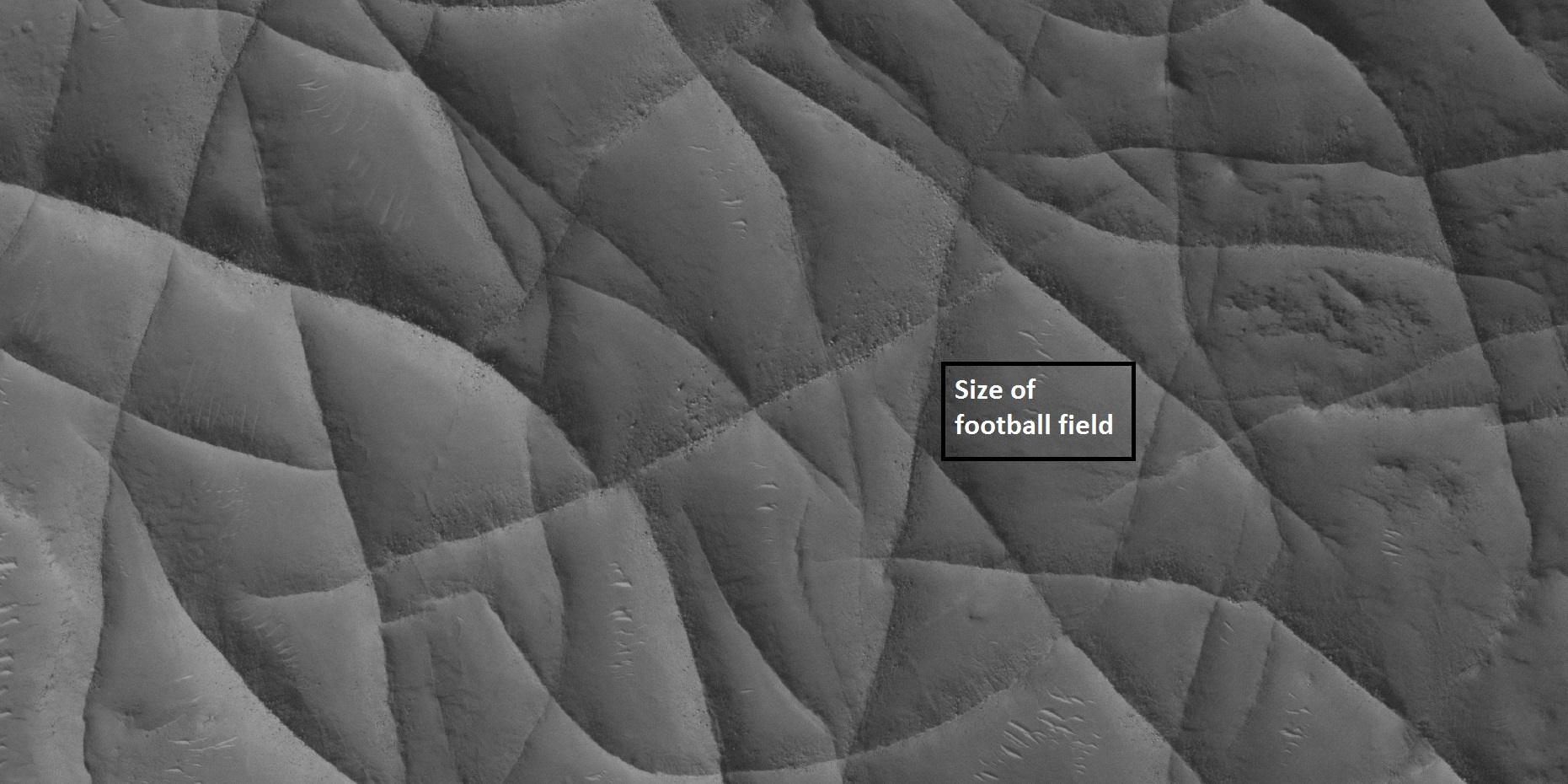
Close view of network of ridges, as seen by HiRISE under HiWish program. This is an enlargement of a previous image. Box shows the size of a football field.

== Linear ridge networks in Syrtis Major quadrangle ==
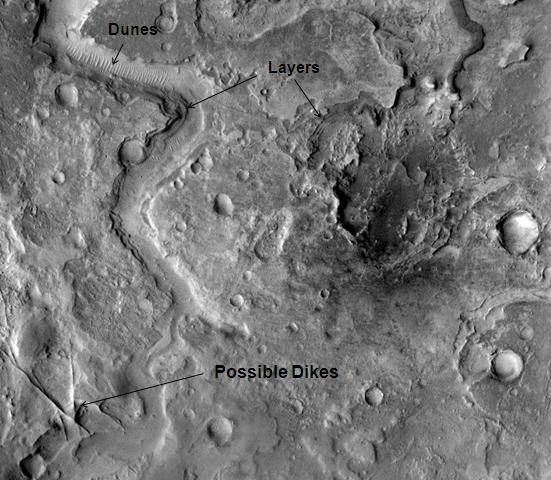
Huo Hsing Vallis in Syrtis Major, as seen by THEMIS. Straight ridges may be dikes in which liquid rock once flowed.

Huo Hsing Vallis Ridges, as seen by HiRISE. Ridges may be caused by water moving along faults.

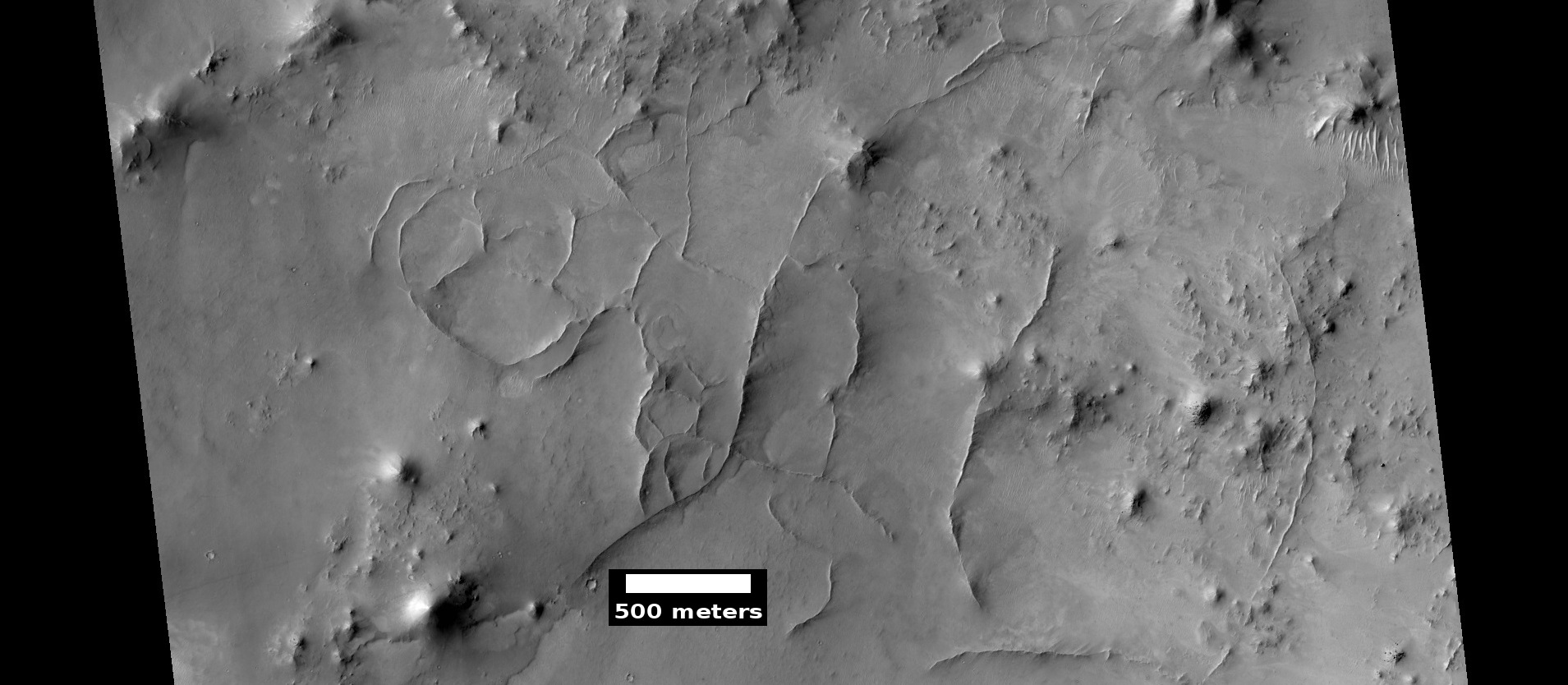
Ridges, as seen by HiRISE under HiWish program. These may be the result of dikes or faults.

== Linear ridge networks in Phaethontis quadrangle ==
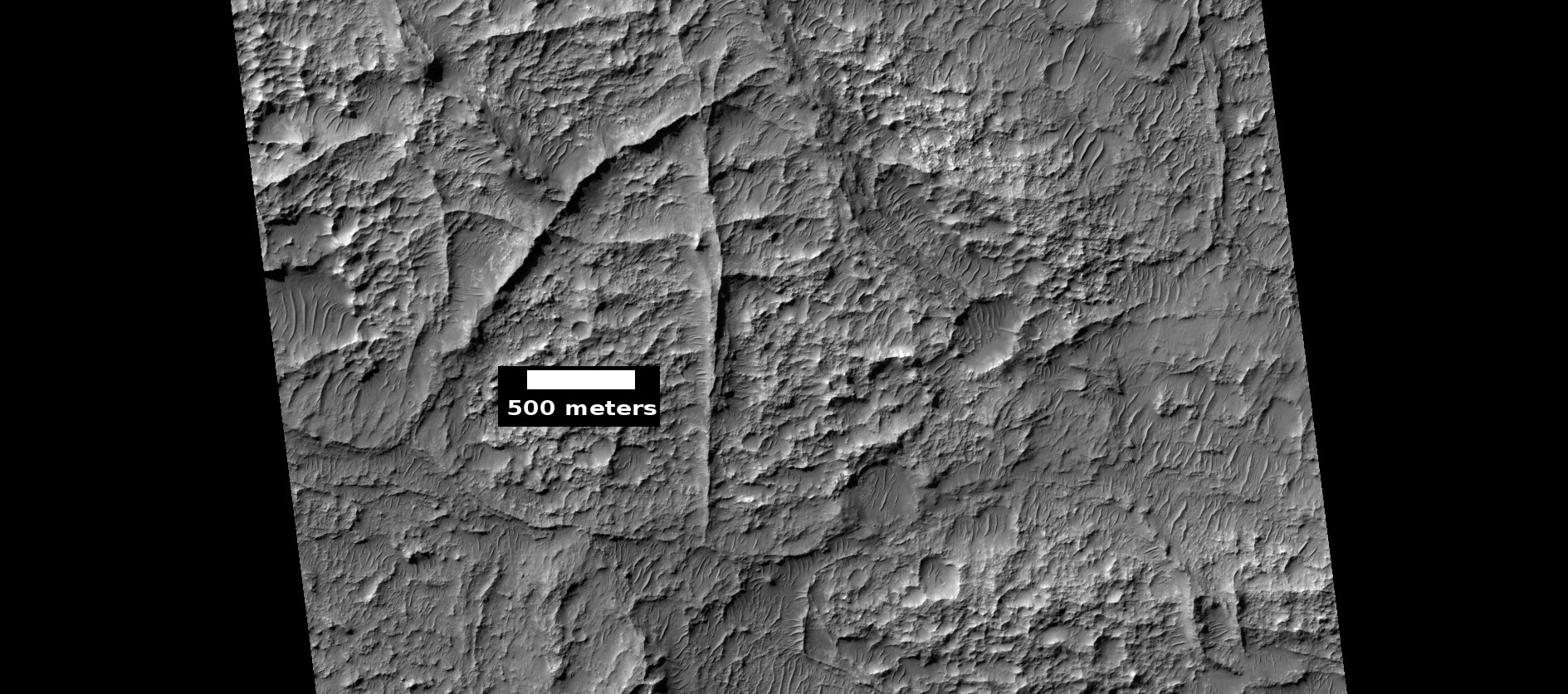
Linear ridge networks, as seen by HiRISE under HiWish program

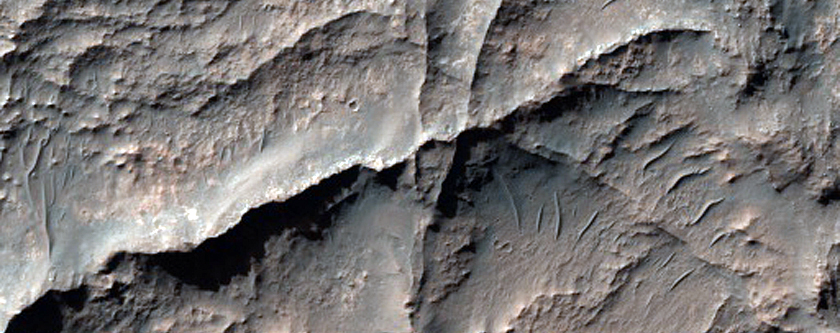
Close-up of linear ridge networks from the previous image, as seen by HiRISE under HiWish program

== Linear ridge networks in Amazonis quadrangle ==
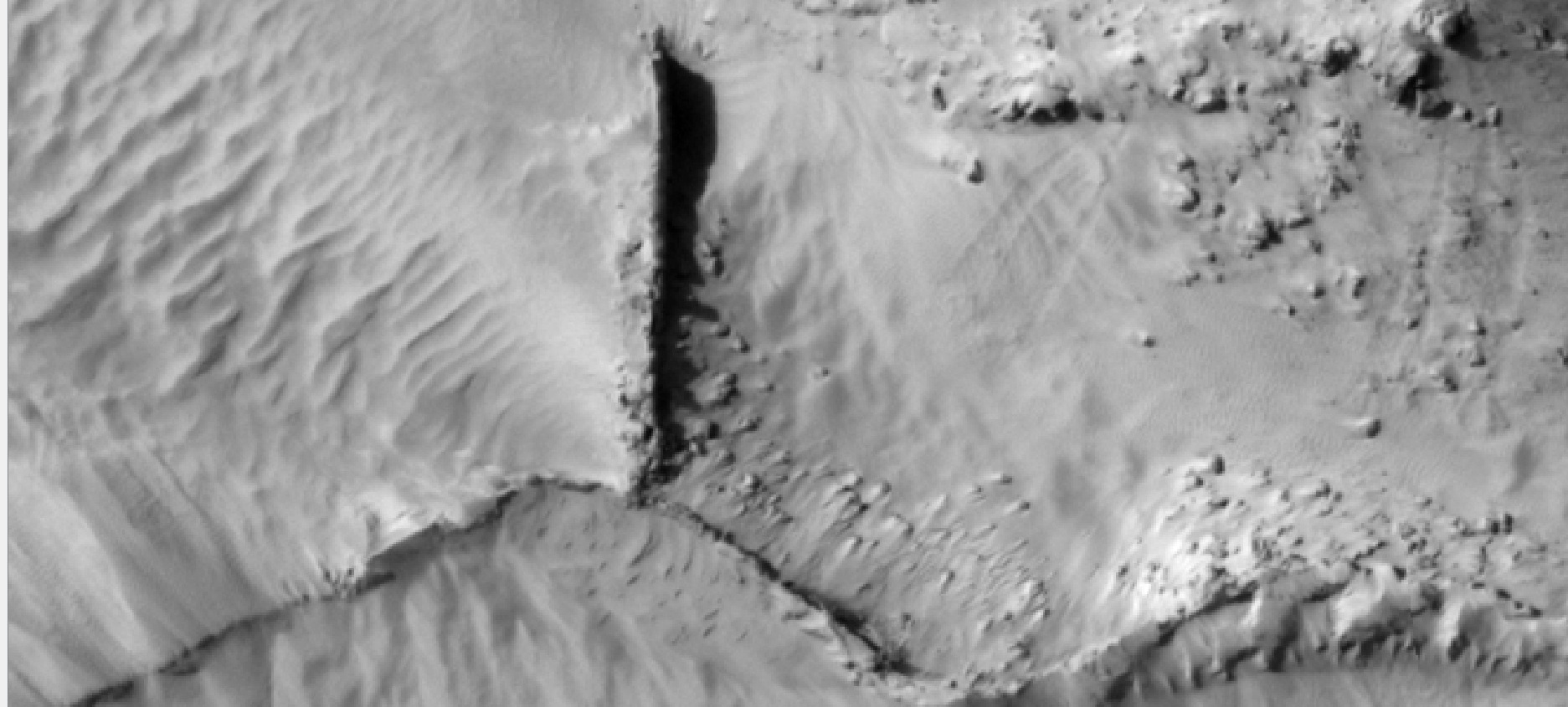
Narrow ridges, as seen by HiRISE under HiWish program. The ridges may be the result of impacts fracturing the surface.

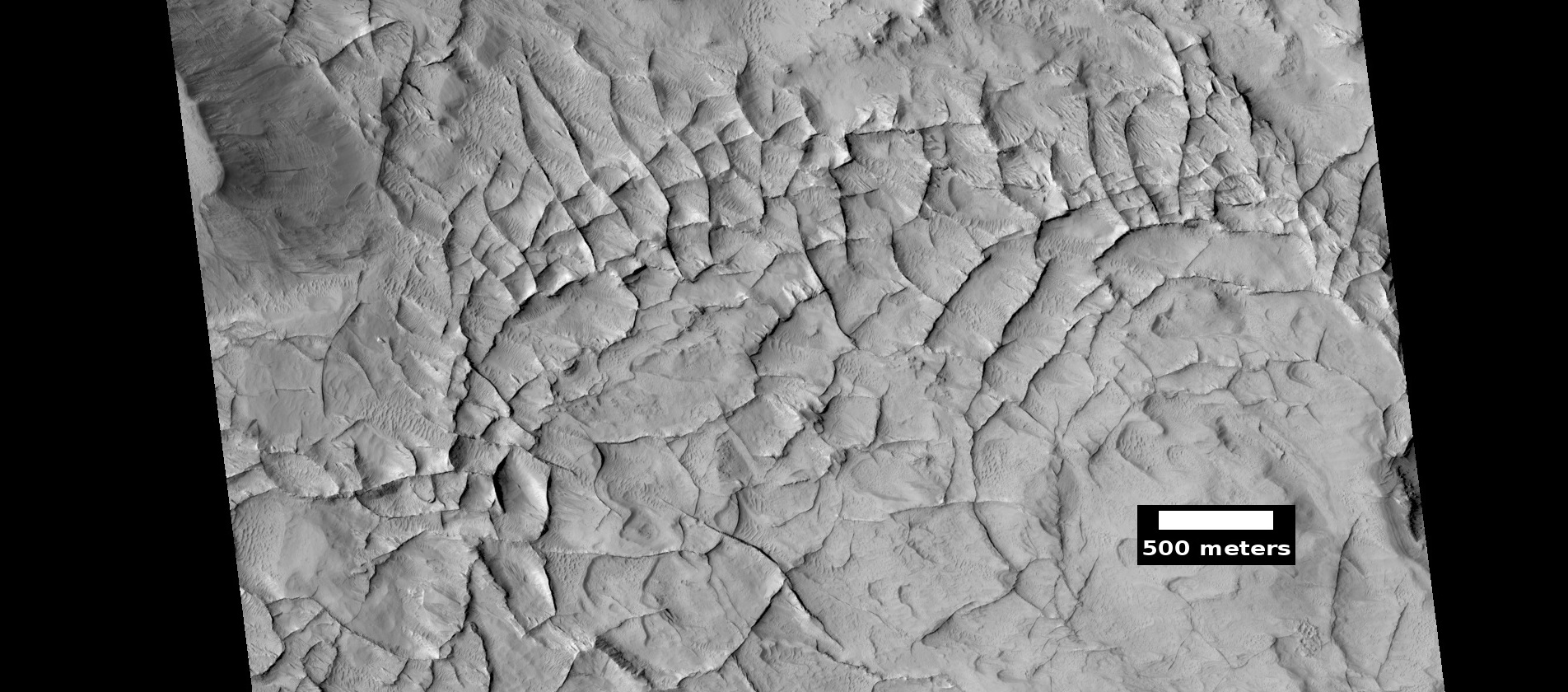
Linear ridge networks, as seen by HiRISE under HiWish program

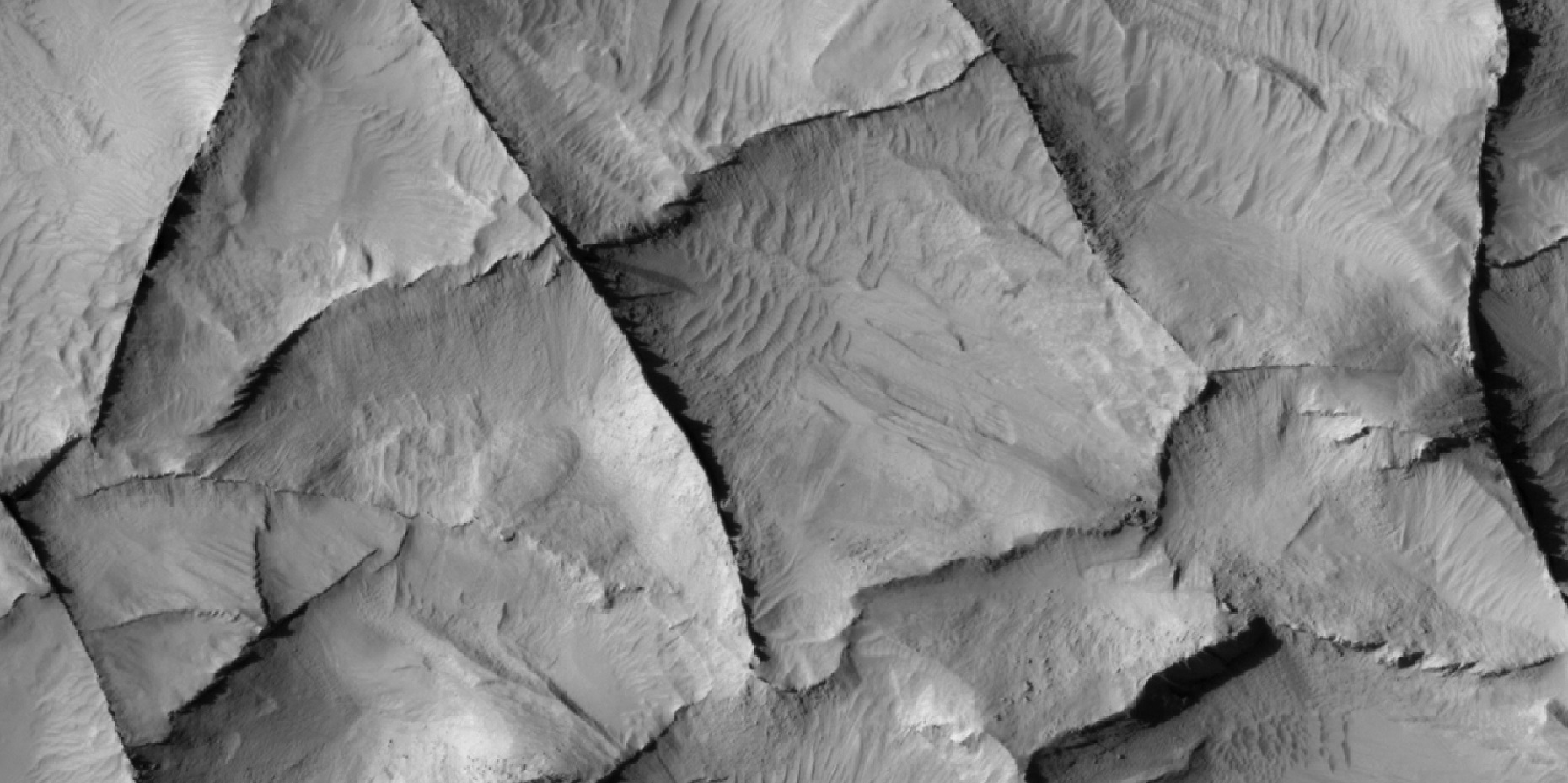
Close-up of ridge network, as seen by HiRISE under HiWish program. This is an enlargement of a previous image.

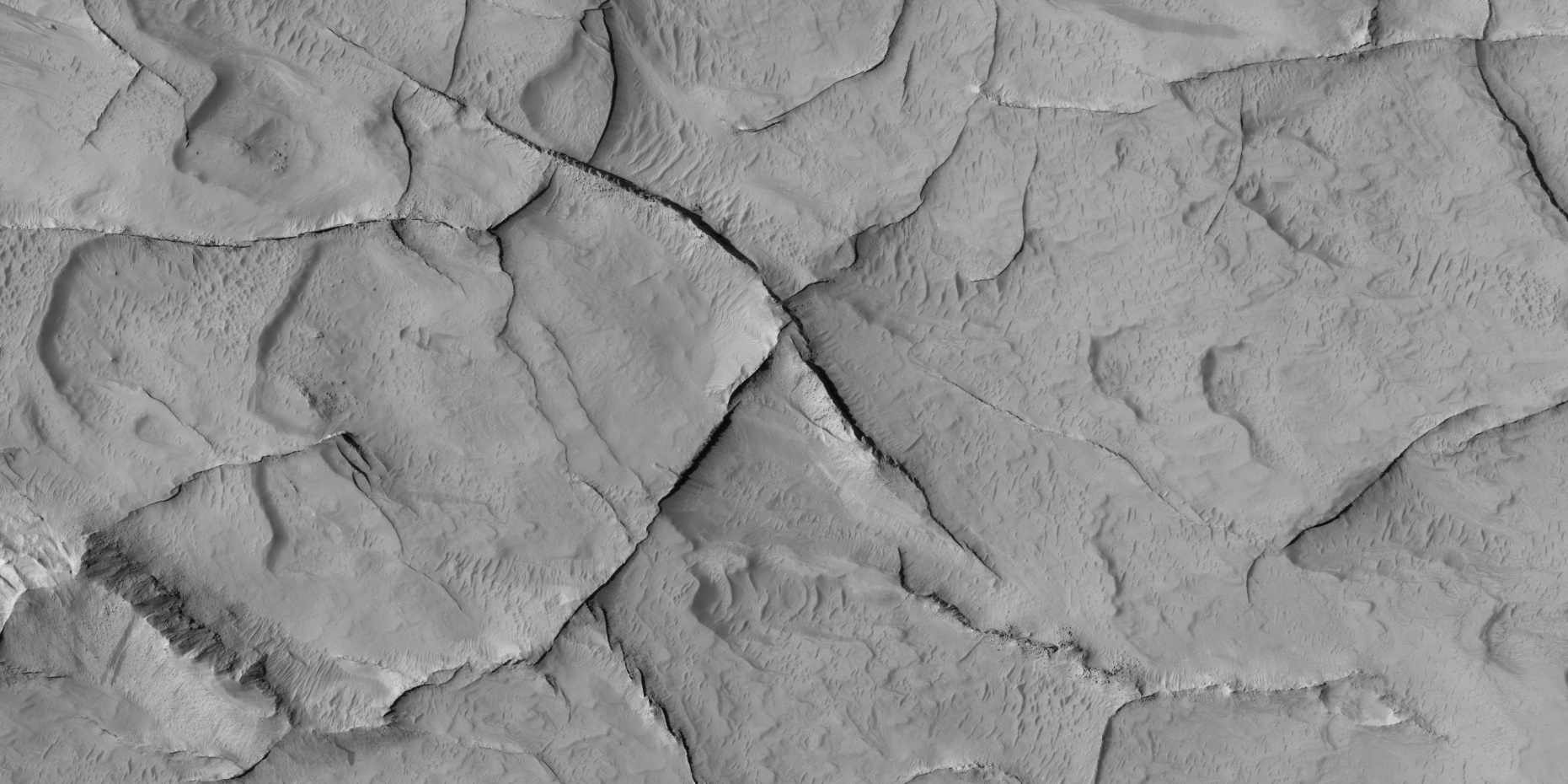
Close-up of ridge network, as seen by HiRISE under HiWish program. This is an enlargement of a previous image.

== Linear ridge networks in Arabia quadrangle ==
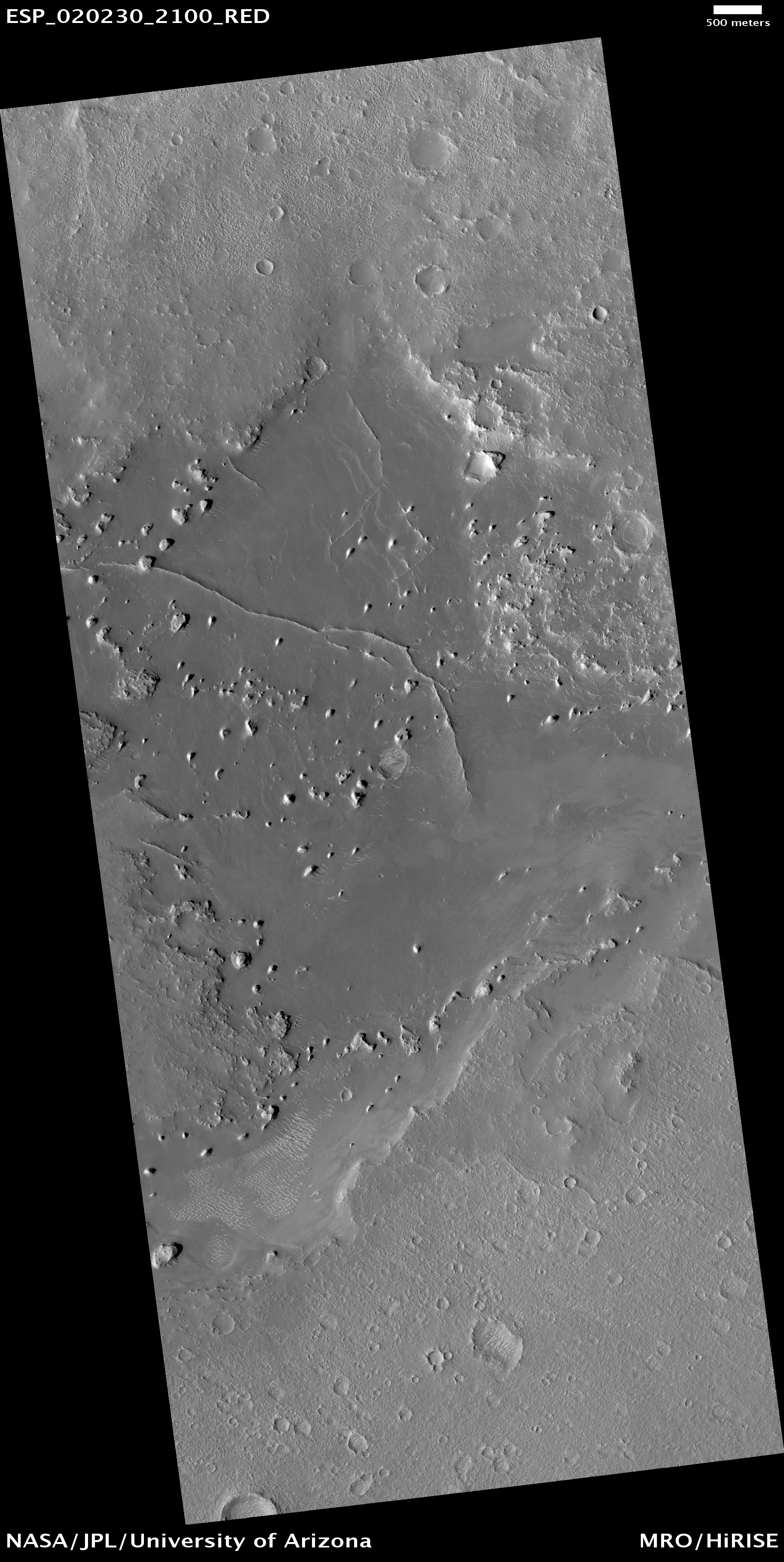
Dikes in Arabia, as seen by HiRISE, under the HiWish program. These straight features may indicate where valuable ore deposits may be found by future colonists. Scale bar is 500 meters. They may be part of linear ridges, hence related to impact craters.

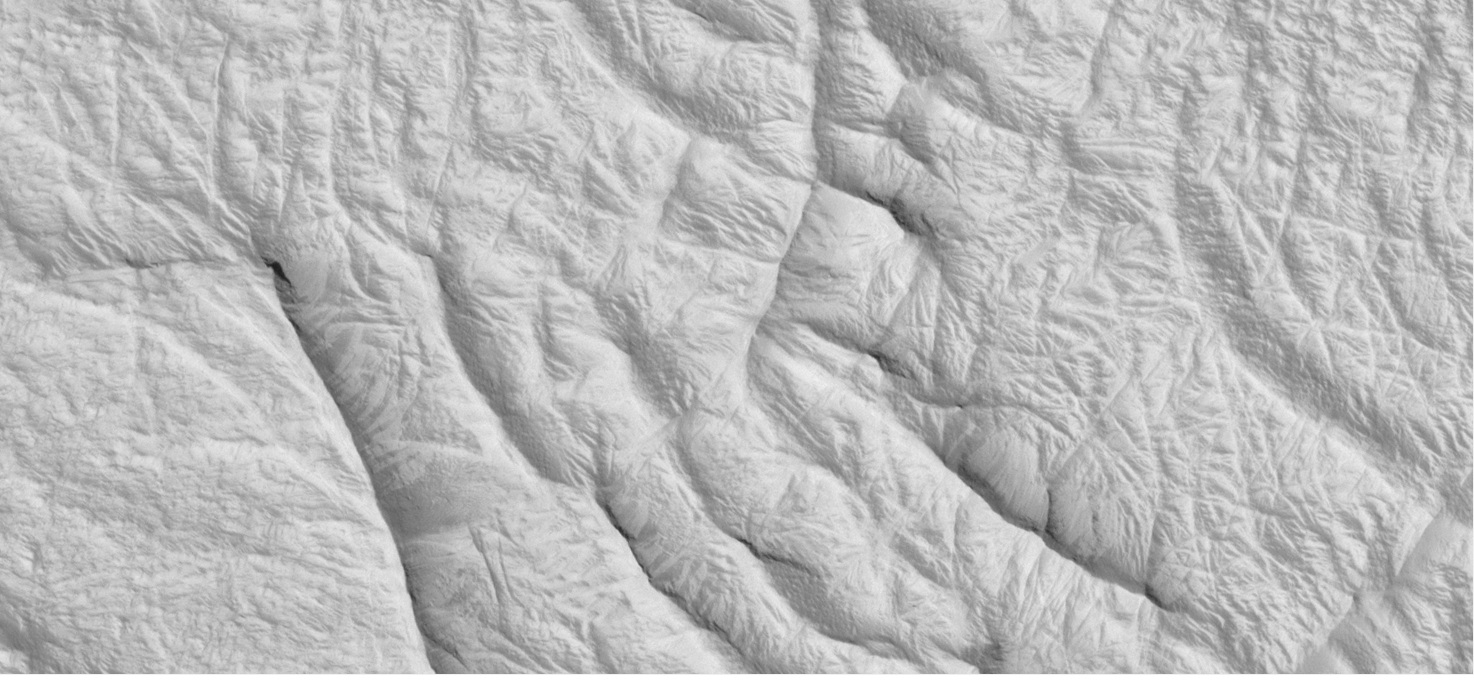
Close-up of a complex group of ridges. The ridges may be the remains of old streams and/or linear ridge networks. Image taken by HiRISE under the HiWish program.

== Linear ridge networks in Arcadia quadrangle ==
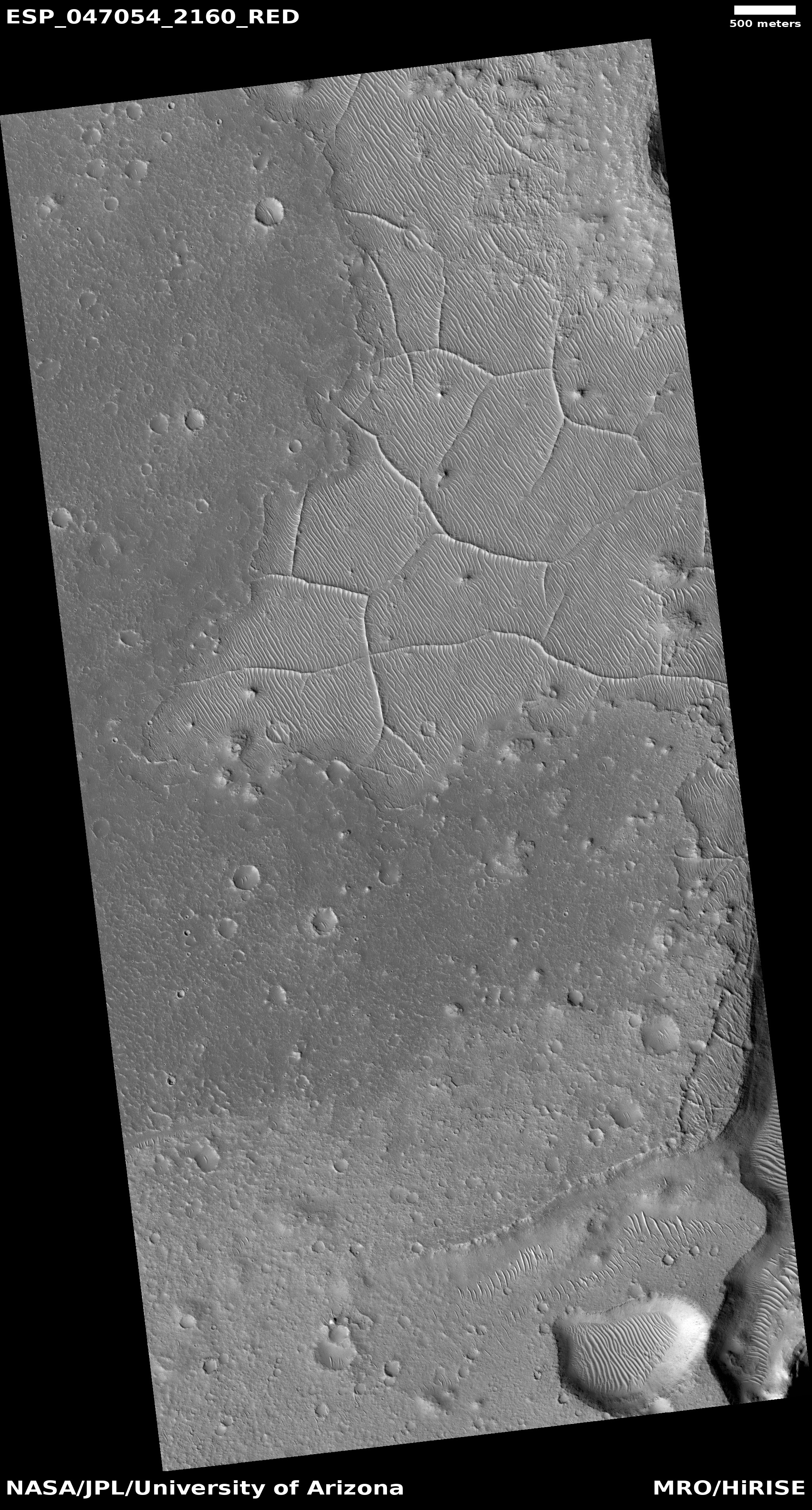
Wide view of ridge network, as seen by HiRISE under HiWish program

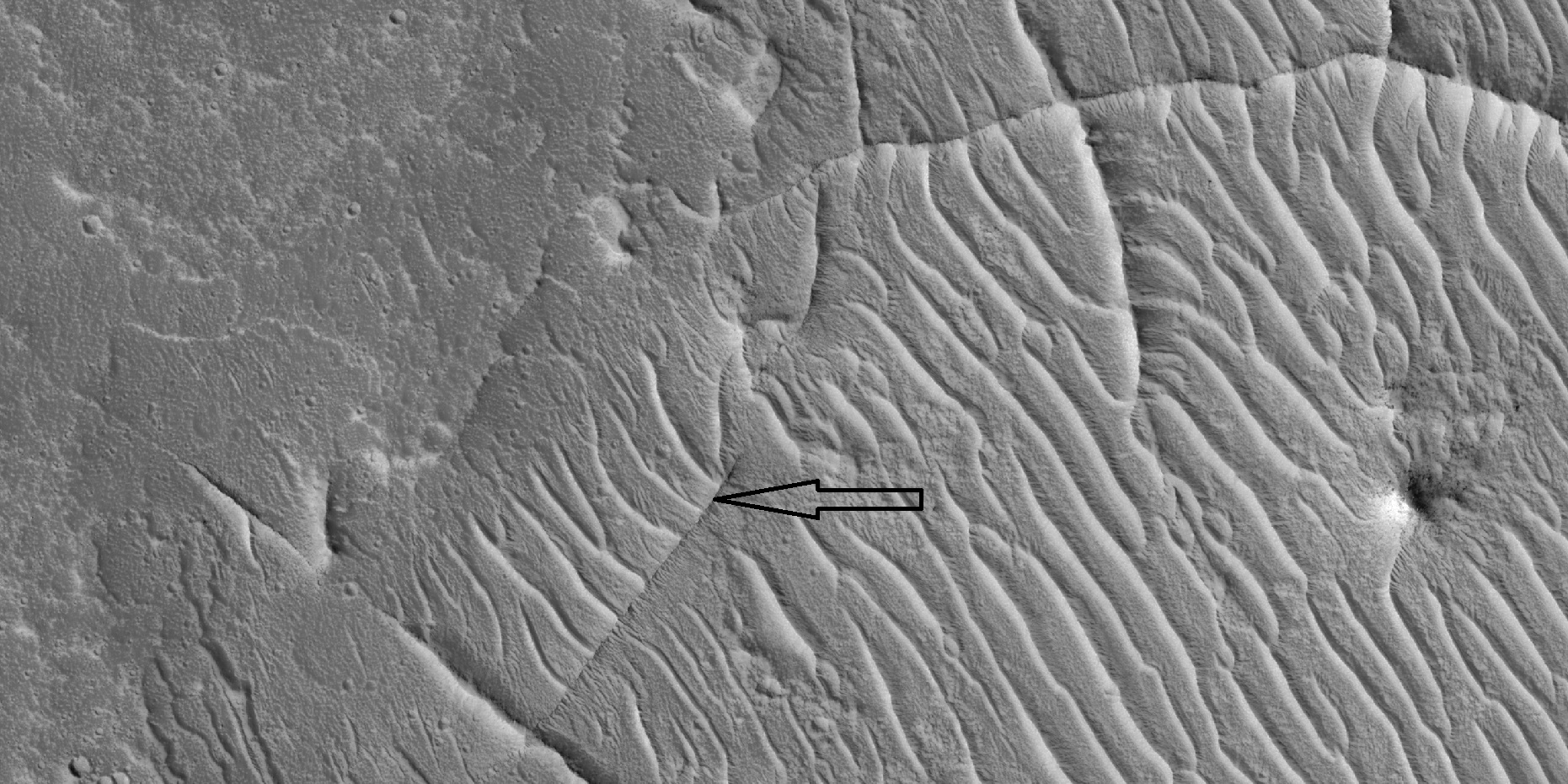
Close view of ridge networks, as seen by HiRISE under HiWish program. Arrow points to small, straight ridge.

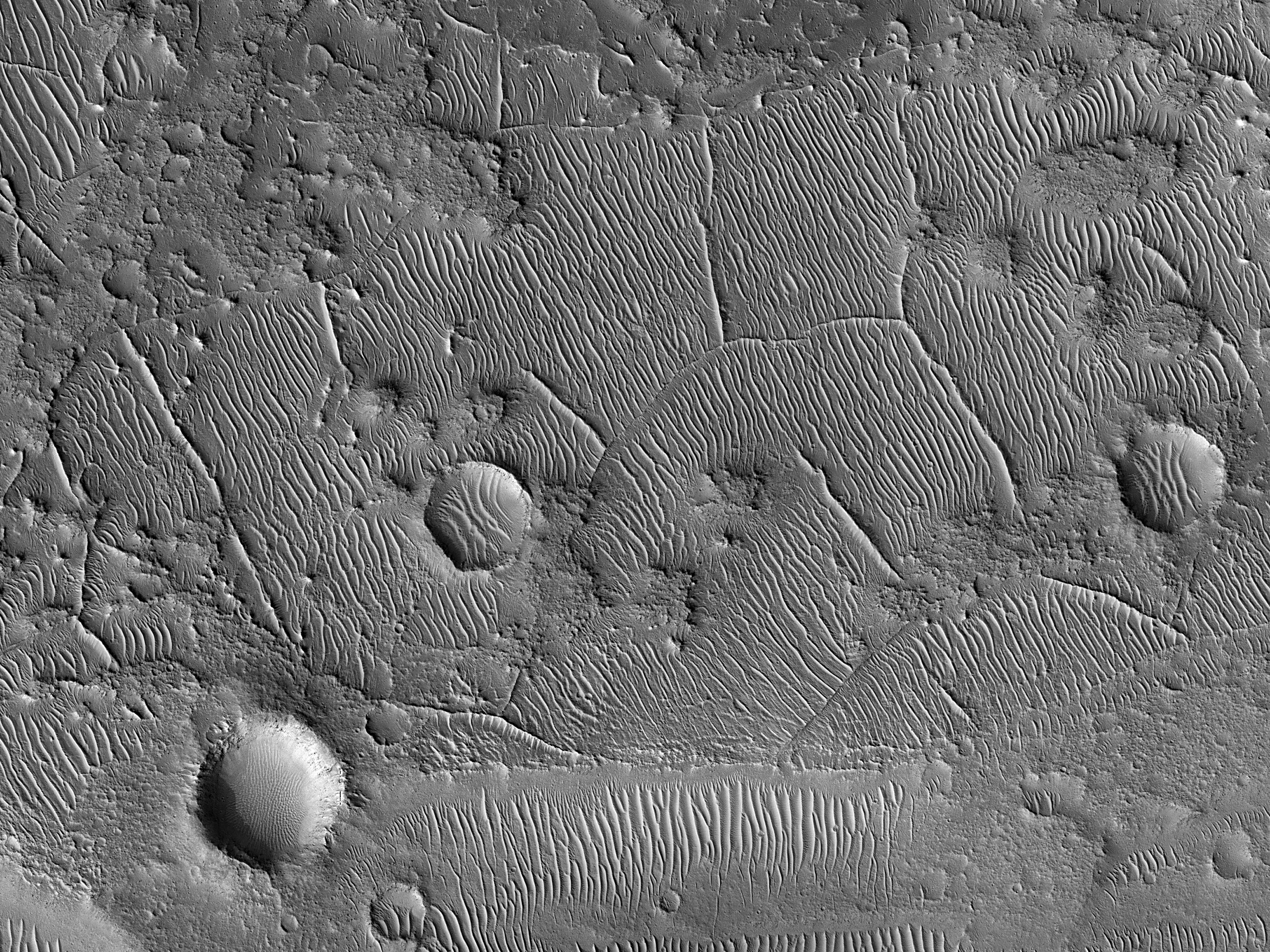
Ridges. This picture was named HiRISE picture of the day on March 29, 2024.

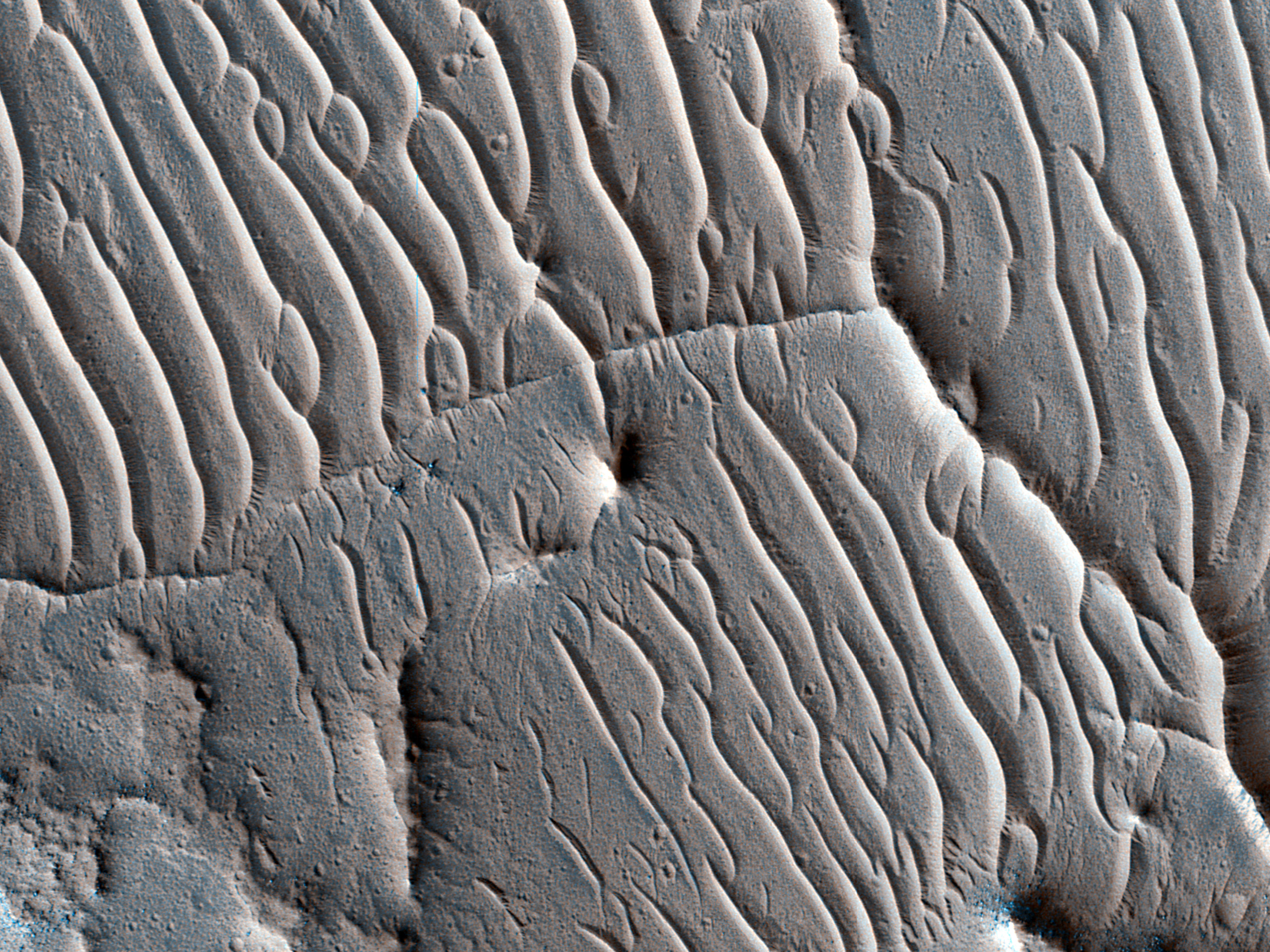
Close view of ridges. This picture was named HiRISE picture of the day on March 29, 2024.

== See also ==
- Craters
- Dike (geology)
- Geology of Mars
