= Cassini (Martian crater) =

Crater on Mars

Cassini Crater
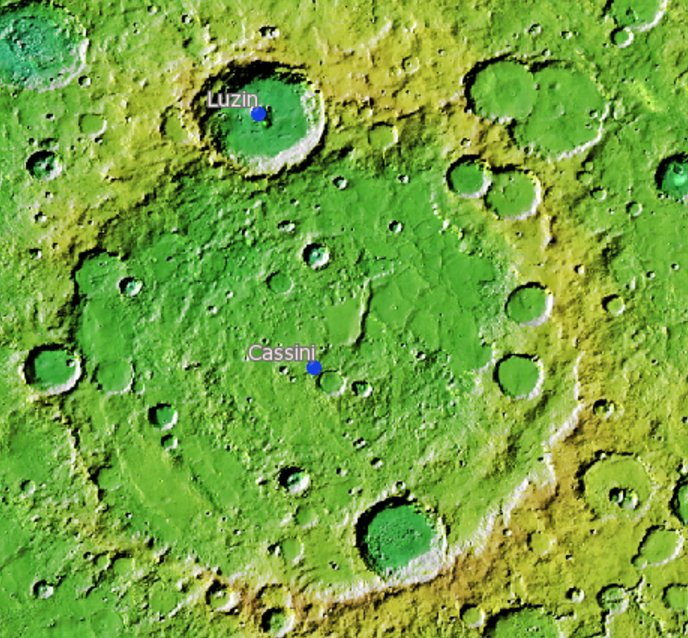
- Location of Cassini Crater
- Planet: Mars
- Region: Arabia quadrangle
- Coordinates: 23.4°N 327.9°W
- Quadrangle: Arabia
- Diameter: 415 km
- Eponym: Giovanni Domenico Cassini

Cassini is a crater on Mars named in honor of the Italian astronomer Giovanni Cassini. The name was approved in 1973, by the International Astronomical Union (IAU) Working Group for Planetary System Nomenclature.

The crater measures approximately 415 kilometers in diameter and can be found at 327.9°W and 23.4°N. It is in the Arabia quadrangle of Mars. Pictures of small craters on the floor of Cassini reveal multiple layers. Some of these layers can be easily seen in the pictures below. Many places on Mars show rocks arranged in layers. Rock can form layers in a variety of ways. Volcanoes, wind, or water can produce layers. A detailed discussion of layering with many Martian examples can be found in Sedimentary Geology of Mars.

Recent research leads scientists to believe that some of the craters in Arabia may have held huge lakes. Cassini Crater probably once was full of water since its rim seems to have been breached by the waters. Both inflow and outflow channels have been observed on its rim. The lake would have contained more water than Earth's Lake Baikal, our largest freshwater lake by volume.

Many craters once contained lakes.

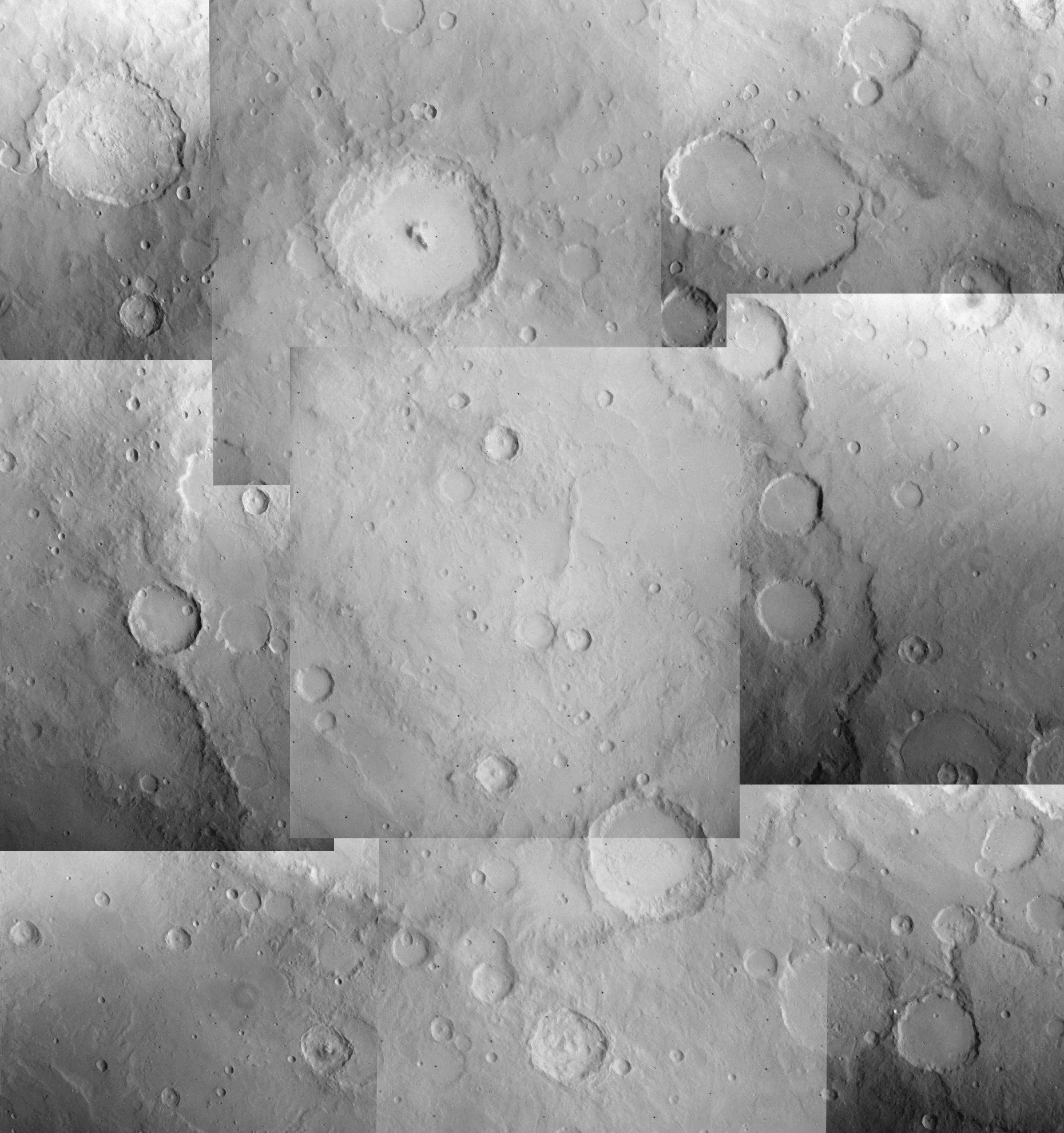
Viking Orbiter 1 mosaic

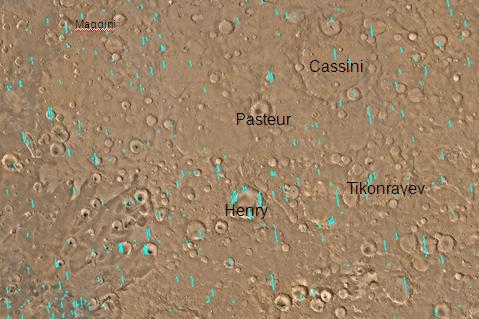
Map of Arabia quadrangle with major craters. Cassini is in the upper right.

== See also ==
- List of craters on Mars
