= List of mountains on Mars =

Named mountains of Mars

Comparison of Mount Sharp (Aeolis Mons) to three Earth peaks

This is a list of all named mountains on Mars.

== Naming ==
Most Martian mountains have a name including one of the following astrogeological terms:

- Mons — large, isolated, mountain; may or may not be of volcanic origin.
  - plural montes — mountain range.
- Tholus — small dome-shaped mountain or hill.
  - plural tholi — group of (usually not contiguous) small mountains.
- Dorsum — long low range. Name type not present on Mars.
  - plural dorsa
- Patera — dish-shaped depressions on volcano peaks; not very high compared to diameter.
  - plural paterae

== Caveats ==
Listed are the elevations of the peaks (the vertical position relative to the areoid, which is the Martian vertical datum — the surface defined as zero elevation by average martian atmospheric pressure and planet radius), which is not the height above the surrounding terrain (topographic prominence). Listed mons elevation is the highest point (at 16 pixels/degree) within the feature. Listed patera elevation is the average elevation of the shallow dish-shaped depression (the actual 'patera') at the summit.

== List ==
| Name | Type | coordinates | Feature diameter (km) | Peak elevation (km) |
|---|---|---|---|---|
| Aeolis (Note: unofficially, "Mount Sharp")) | mons | 5.08°S 137.85°E | 89 | 5.5 |
| Alba | mons (Note: formerly patera) | 41.1°N 249.3°E | 548 | 6.8 |
| Albor | tholus | 18.87°N 150.47°E | 170 | 4.5 |
| Anseris | mons | 29.81°S 86.65°E | 58 | 4.2 |
| Aonia | mons | 53.3°N 272.1°E | 27 | |
| Aonia | tholus | 59.0°S 280.0°E | 54 | |
| Apollinaris | mons (Note: formerly patera) | 9.2°S 174.8°E | 275 | 5.0 |
| Apollinaris | tholus | 64°S 175.75°E | 33 | 3.2 |
| Argyre | mons | 50.4°S 311.9°E | 61 | |
| Arsia | mons | 8.4°S 239.91°E | 475 | 20.0 |
| Ascraeus | mons | 11.92°N 255.92°E | 460 | 18.2 |
| Ausonia | montes | 25.42°S 99.04°E | 158 | 1.4 |
| Australe | montes | 80.19°S 14.05°E | 387 | 5.0 |
| Biblis | tholus (Note: formerly patera) | 2.5°N 235.6°E | 169 | 3.0 |
| Centauri | montes | 38.67°S 95.52°E | 270 | 1.4 |
| Ceraunius | tholus | 24.25°N 262.75°E | 130 | 7.5 |
| Cerberus | tholi | 4.5°N 164.4°E | 698 | |
| Chalce | montes | 53.72°S 322.35°E | 95 | 2.3 |
| Charitum | montes | 58.1°S 319.71°E | 850 | 2.5 |
| Chronius | mons | 61.5°S 178.0°E | 56 | |
| Coprates | montes | 13°S 294.6°E | 350 | |
| Coronae | montes | 34.31°S 86.11°E | 236 | |
| Echus | montes | 7.81°N 282.05°E | 395 | |
| Electris | mons | 45.7°S 152.7°E | 105 | |
| Eridania | mons | 57.0°S 137.9°E | 143 | |
| Elysium | mons | 25.02°N 147.21°E | 410 | 13.9 |
| Erebus | montes | 35.66°N 185.2°E | 785 | |
| Euripus | mons | 44.82°S 105.18°E | 91 | 4.5 |
| Galaxius | mons | 34.76°N 142.31°E | 22 | |
| Gervon | montes | 7.72°S 278.38°E | 359 | 2.3 |
| Gonnus | mons | 41.21°N 269.12°E | 57 | 2.9 |
| Hadriacus (Note: formerly Hadriaca patera) | mons | 31.29°S 91.86°E | 450 | |
| Hecates | tholus | 32.42°N 150.24°E | 183 | 4.7 |
| Hellas | montes | 37.63°S 97.61°E | 153 | 1.3 |
| Hellespontus | montes | 44.37°S 42.76°E | 730 | |
| Hibes | montes | 3.79°N 171.34°E | 137 | |
| Horarum | mons | 51.05°S 323.44°E | 20 | |
| Issedon | tholus | 36.38°N 265.17°E | 52 | 0.8 |
| Jovis | tholus | 18.41°N 242.59°E | 58 | 3.0 |
| Labeatis | mons | 37.48°N 284.14°E | 22.5 | 1.9 |
| Libya | montes | 1.44°N 88.23°E | 1,170 | 2.1 |
| Mareotis (east) | tholus | 36.24°N 274.87°E | 5.0 | 0.6 |
| Mareotis (north) | tholus | 36.7°N 273.79°E | 3.0 | 0.8 |
| Mareotis (west) | tholus | 35.88°N 272.04°E | 12.0 | 1.3 |
| Nectaris | montes | 14.6°S 305.4°E | 220 | |
| Nereidum | montes | 37.57°S 316.79°E | 1,130 | 1.9 |
| Nia | tholus | 6.6°S 285.1°E | 34 | |
| Nili | tholus | 9.2°N 67.4°E | 7 | |
| Oceanidum (Note: formerly Charitum Tholus) | mons | 55.2°S 41.3°E | 33 | |
| Octantis | mons | 54.93°S 318.77°E | 19 | |
| Olympus (Note: formerly Nix Olympica, tallest or second-tallest known mountain in Solar System) | mons | 18.65°N 226.2°E | 648 | 27.0 |
| Pavonis | mons | 1.48°N 247.04°E | 375 | 14.0 |
| Peraea | mons | 31.08°S 86.11°E | 21.5 | |
| Phlegra | montes | 40.4°N 163.71°E | 1,350 | |
| Pindus | mons | 39.47°N 271.48°E | 16.5 | 1.1 |
| Pityusa | patera | 66.88°S 36.86°E | 230 | 6.158 |
| Promethei | mons | 70.6°S 87.4°E | 65.2 | |
| Scandia | tholi | 74.09°N 201.28°E | 480 | |
| Sirenum | mons | 38.2°S 212.2°E | 123 | |
| Sirenum | tholus | 34.6°S 215.2°E | 54 | |
| Sisyphi | montes | 69.65°S 13.08°E | 200 | |
| Sisyphi | tholus | 75.7°S 341.5°E | 28 | 2.1 |
| Syria | mons | 13.92°S 104.3°E | 80 | 6.7 |
| Tanaica | montes | 39.55°N 269.17°E | 177 | |
| Tartarus | montes | 15.46°N 167.54°E | 1,070 | |
| Tharsis | montes | 1.57°N 247.42°E | 1,840 | |
| Tharsis | tholus | 13.41°N 269.31°E | 158 | 9.0 |
| Thyles | montes | 69.9°S 126.5°E | 380 | |
| Tyrrhenus (Note: also Tyrrhena Mons, formerly Tyrrhena patera) | mons | 21.63°S 105.88°E | 143 | |
| Ulysses | tholus (Note: formerly patera) | 3.0°N 238.5°E | 102 | |
| Uranius | mons (Note: formerly patera) | 26.9°N 267.9°E | 265 | 4.9 |
| Uranius | tholus | 26.52°N 262.43°E | 62 | 4.3 |
| Xanthe | montes | 18.13°N 305.08°E | 500 | |
| Zephyria | tholus | 19.96°S 172.92°E | 30.5 | 2.8 |

== Gallery ==
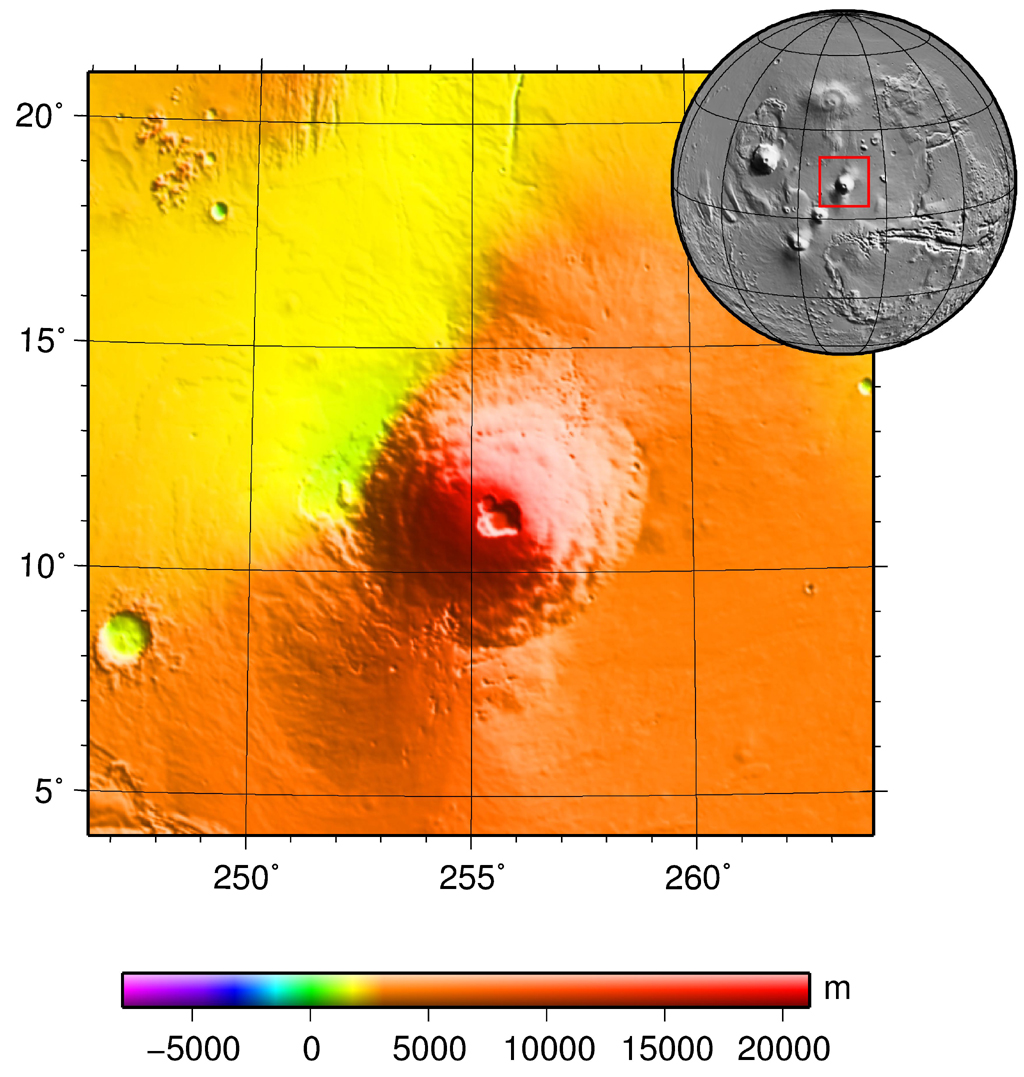
Topographic map of Ascraeus mons

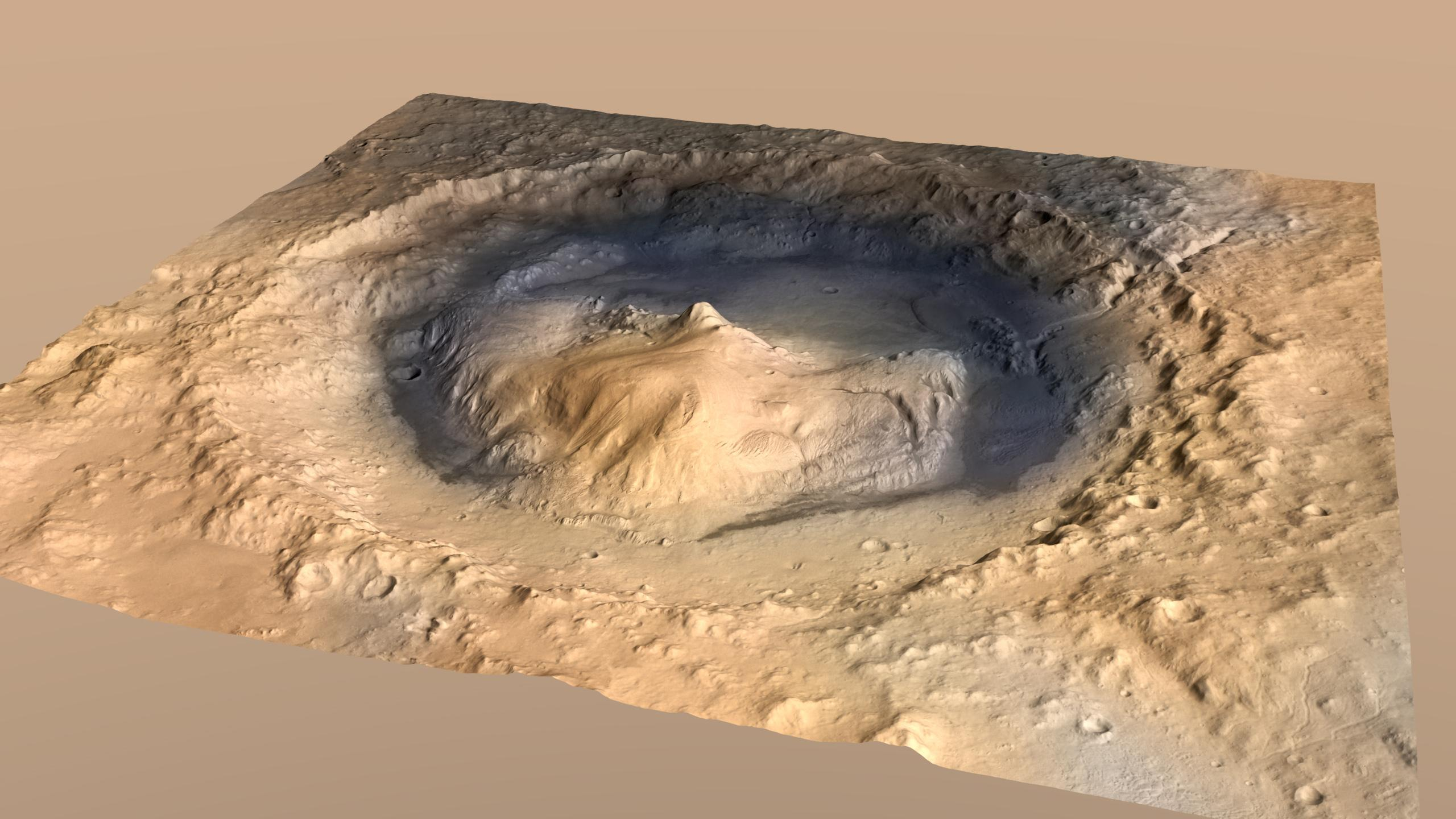
Aeolis Mons, oblique view

== See also ==
- List of craters on Mars
- List of extraterrestrial volcanoes
- List of tallest mountains in the Solar System
- Volcanism on Mars – Past Geological Phenomenon on Mars
- Mineralogy of Mars
