= Ulysses Tholus =

Martian volcano

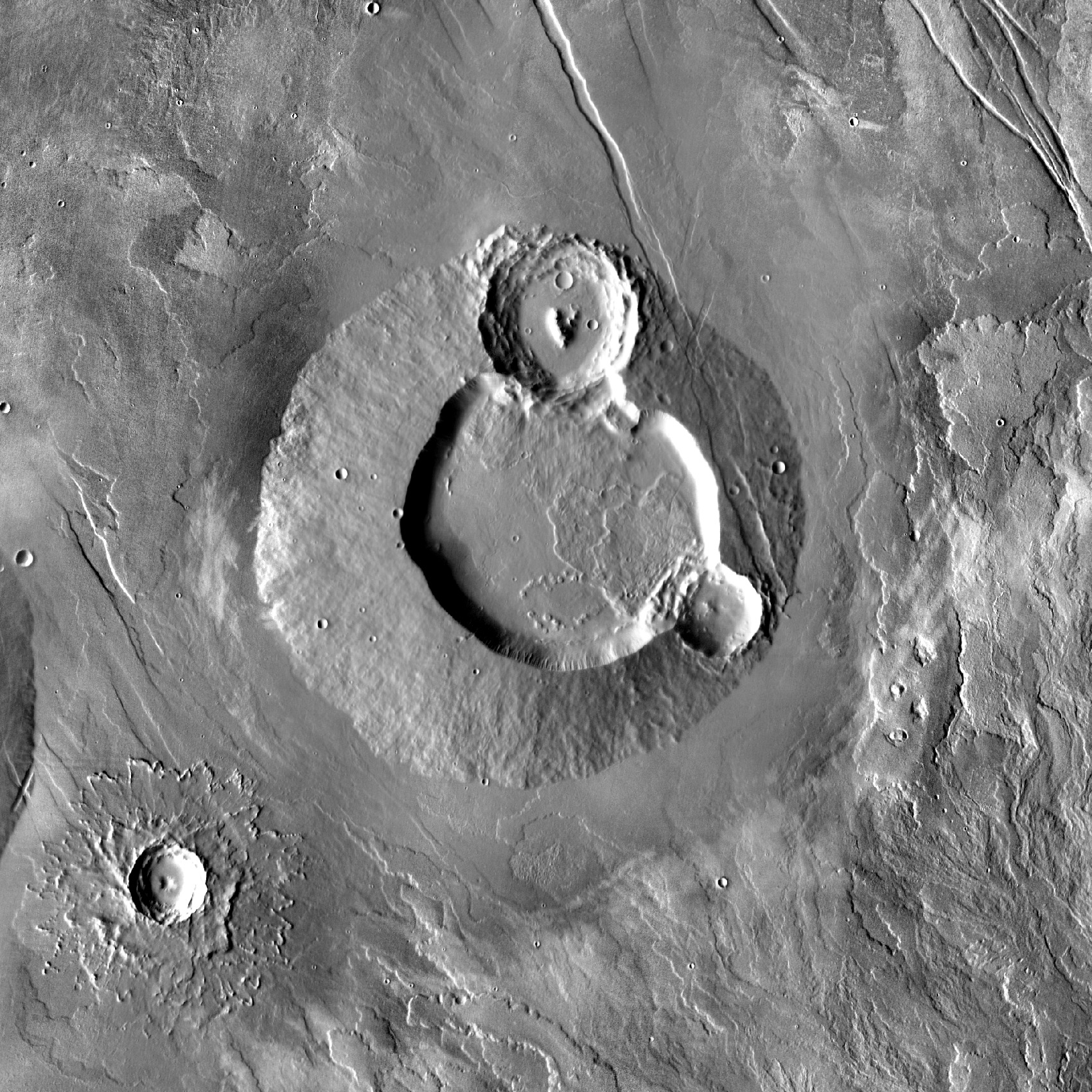
- THEMIS daytime IR mosaic of Ulysses Tholus. Much of the caldera floor is covered by deposits from landslides triggered by the formation of adjacent impact craters.
- Coordinates: 2.89°N 121.55°W

Ulysses Tholus is a Martian volcano. It is located in the Tharsis quadrangle at 2.89° north latitude and 121.55° west longitude. It is 58 km across and is named after a classical albedo feature. Ulysses Tholus is immediately east and slightly north of another volcano, Biblis Tholus. The name of the mountain itself was changed on September 19, 2007. The former terminology, Ulysses Patera, now applies only (and more accurately) to the central caldera, whereas formerly it had applied to the whole edifice. Tholus describes a volcanic edifice somewhat smaller than would be implied by mons.

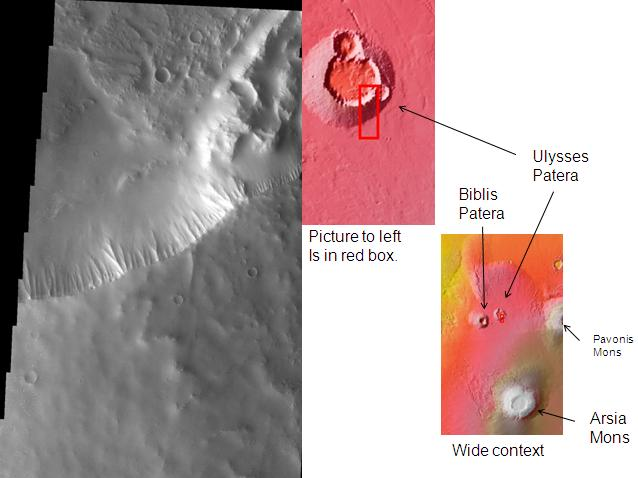
Location of Ulysses Tholus in relation to other volcanoes (photo by THEMIS).

Map of Tharsis quadrangle with major features indicated, Ulysses Tholus is on the bottom-left

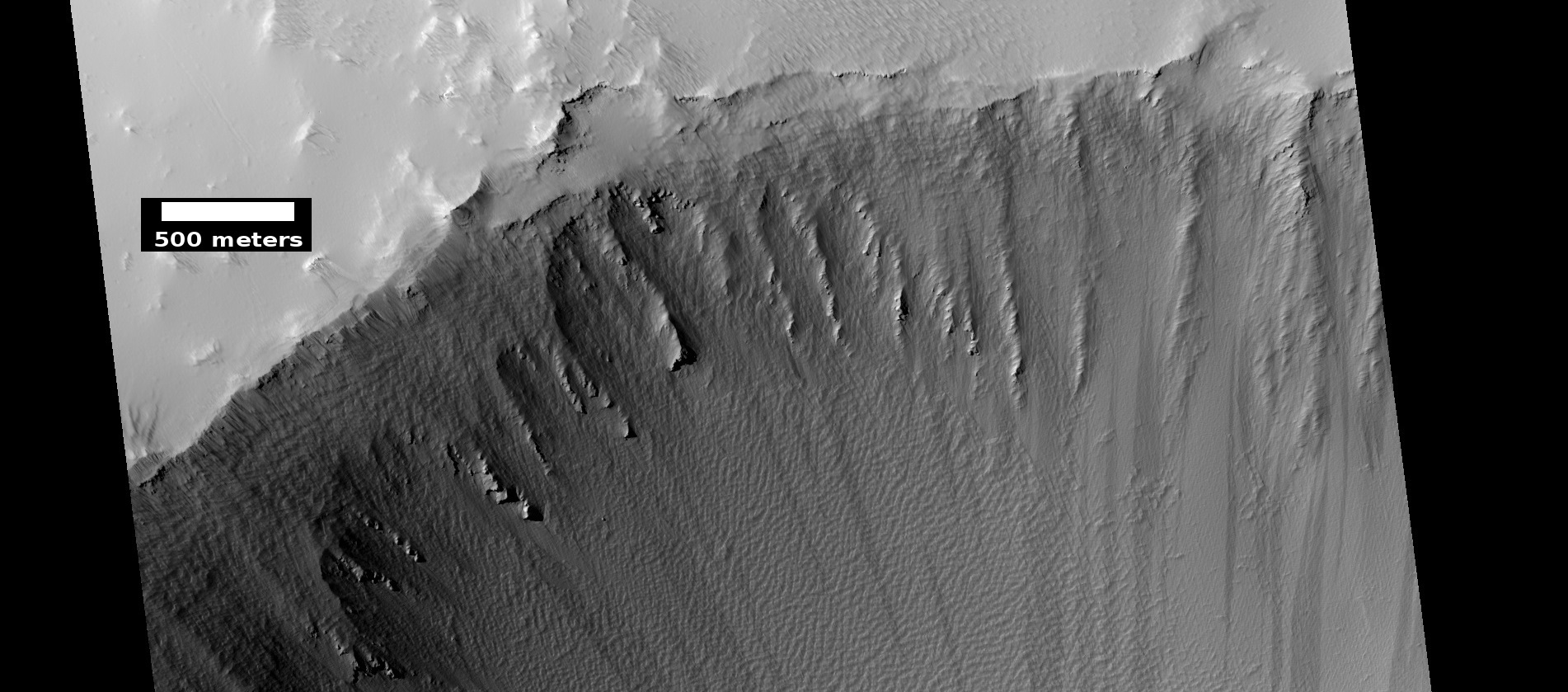
Crater at the top of Ulysses Patera, as seen by HiRISE under HiWish program Note the lack of a rim. Volcanic craters do not usually have a rim, as most impact craters do.

== See also ==
- HiRISE
- Geology of Mars
- List of mountains on Mars by height
- Volcanoes on Mars
- Volcanology of Mars
