= Volcanism on Mars =

Past Geological Phenomenon on Mars

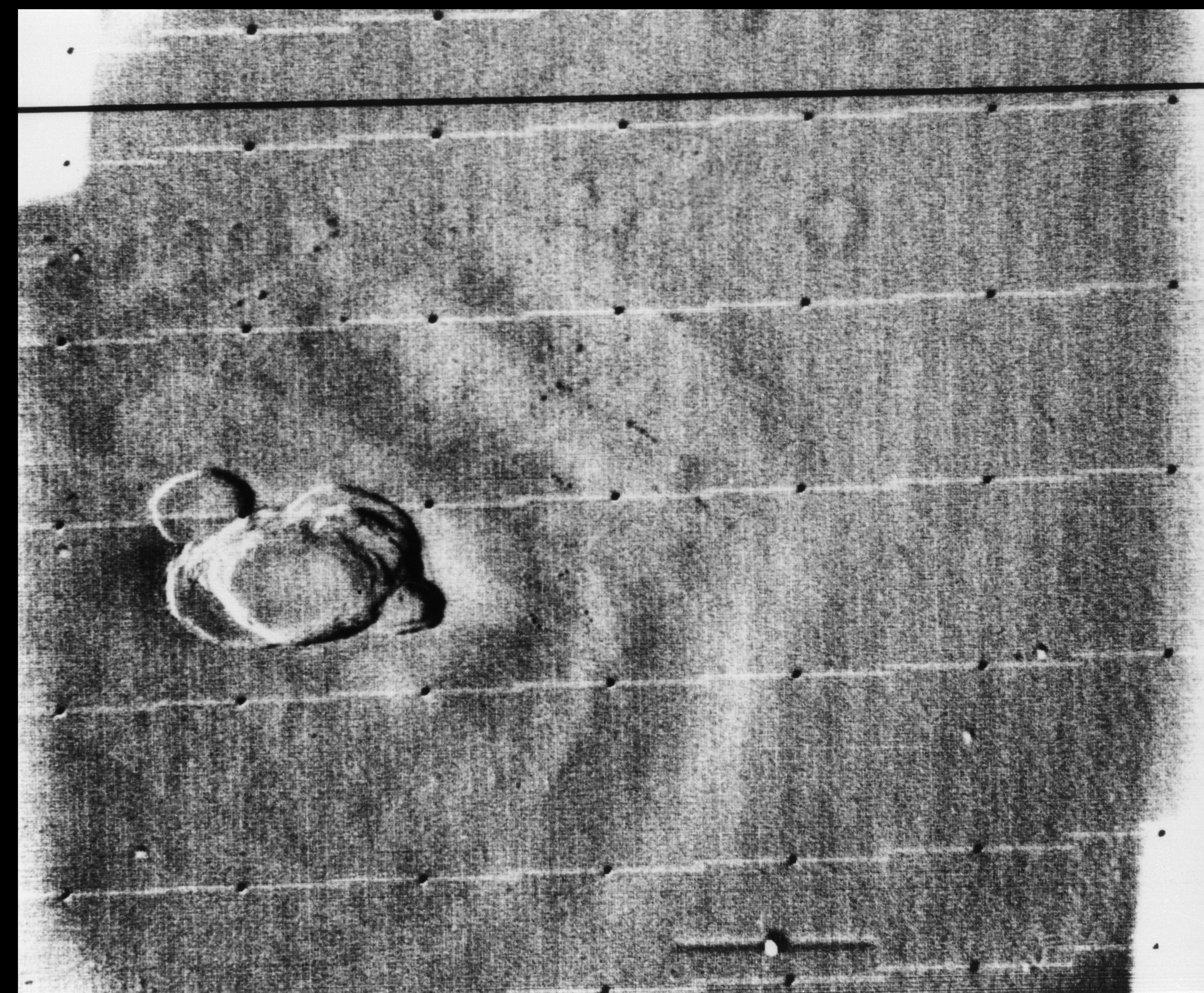
Mariner 9 image of Ascraeus Mons. This is one of the first images to show that Mars has large volcanoes.

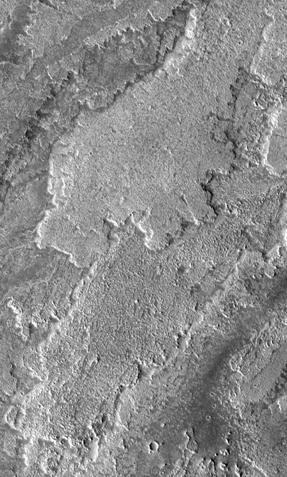
THEMIS image of lava flows with lobate edges (from Arsia Mons volcano)

Using Earth to understand how water may have affected volcanoes on Mars

Volcanic activity, or volcanism, has played a significant role in the geologic evolution of Mars. Scientists have known since the Mariner 9 mission in 1972 that volcanic features cover large portions of the Martian surface. These features include extensive lava flows, vast lava plains, and, such as Olympus Mons, the largest known volcanoes in the Solar System. Martian volcanic features range in age from Noachian (>3.7 billion years) to late Amazonian (< 500 million years), indicating that the planet has been volcanically active throughout its history, and some speculate it probably still is so today. Both Mars and Earth are large, differentiated planets built from similar chondritic materials. Many of the same magmatic processes that occur on Earth also occurred on Mars, and both planets are similar enough compositionally that the same names can be applied to their igneous rocks.

== Background ==
Volcanism is a process in which magma from a planet's interior rises through the crust and erupts on the surface. The erupted materials consist of molten rock (lava), hot fragmental debris (tephra or ash), and gases. Volcanism is a principal way that planets release their internal heat. Volcanic eruptions produce distinctive landforms, rock types, and terrains that provide a window on the chemical composition, thermal state, and history of a planet's interior.

Magma is a complex, high-temperature mixture of molten silicates, suspended crystals, and dissolved gases. Magma on Mars likely ascends in a similar manner to that on Earth. It rises through the lower crust in diapiric bodies that are less dense than the surrounding material. As the magma rises, it eventually reaches regions of lower density. When the magma density matches that of the host rock, buoyancy is neutralized and the magma body stalls. At this point, it may form a magma chamber and spread out laterally into a network of dikes and sills. Subsequently, the magma may cool and solidify to form intrusive igneous bodies (plutons). Geologists estimate that about 80% of the magma generated on Earth stalls in the crust and never reaches the surface.

Schematic diagrams showing the principles behind fractional crystallisation in a magma. While cooling, the magma evolves in composition because different minerals crystallize from the melt. 1: olivine crystallizes; 2: olivine and pyroxene crystallize; 3: pyroxene and plagioclase crystallize; 4: plagioclase crystallizes. At the bottom of the magma reservoir, a cumulate rock forms.

As magma rises and cools, it undergoes many complex and dynamic compositional changes. Heavier minerals may crystallize and settle to the bottom of the magma chamber. The magma may also assimilate portions of host rock or mix with other batches of magma. These processes alter the composition of the remaining melt, so that any magma reaching the surface may be chemically quite different from its parent melt. Magmas that have been so altered are said to be "evolved" to distinguish them from "primitive" magmas that more closely resemble the composition of their mantle source. (See igneous differentiation and fractional crystallization.) More highly evolved magmas are usually felsic, that is enriched in silica, volatiles, and other light elements compared to iron- and magnesium-rich (mafic) primitive magmas. The degree and extent to which magmas evolve over time is an indication of a planet's level of internal heat and tectonic activity. The Earth's continental crust is made up of evolved granitic rocks that developed through many episodes of magmatic reprocessing. Evolved igneous rocks are much less common on cold, dead bodies such as the Moon. Mars, being intermediate in size between the Earth and the Moon, is thought to be intermediate in its level of magmatic activity.

At shallower depths in the crust, the lithostatic pressure on the magma body decreases. The reduced pressure can cause gases (volatiles), such as carbon dioxide and water vapor, to exsolve from the melt into a froth of gas bubbles. The nucleation of bubbles causes a rapid expansion and cooling of the surrounding melt, producing glassy shards that may erupt explosively as tephra (also called pyroclastics). Fine-grained tephra is commonly referred to as volcanic ash. Whether a volcano erupts explosively or effusively as fluid lava depends on the composition of the melt. Felsic magmas of andesitic and rhyolitic composition tend to erupt explosively. They are very viscous (thick and sticky) and rich in dissolved gases. Mafic magmas, on the other hand, are low in volatiles and commonly erupt effusively as basaltic lava flows. However, these are only generalizations. For example, magma that comes into sudden contact with groundwater or surface water may erupt violently in steam explosions called hydromagmatic (phreatomagmatic or phreatic) eruptions. Erupting magmas may also behave differently on planets with different interior compositions, atmospheres, and gravitational fields.

== Differences in volcanic styles between Earth and Mars ==
Planet Mars – volatile gases (Curiosity rover, October 2012)

The most common form of volcanism on the Earth is basaltic. Basalts are extrusive igneous rocks derived from the partial melting of the upper mantle. They are rich in iron and magnesium (mafic) minerals and commonly dark gray in color. The principal type of volcanism on Mars is almost certainly also basaltic. On Earth, basaltic magmas commonly erupt as highly fluid flows, which either emerge directly from vents or form by the coalescence of molten clots at the base of lava fountains (Hawaiian eruption). These styles are also common on Mars, but the lower gravity and atmospheric pressure on Mars allow nucleation of gas bubbles (see above) to occur more readily and at greater depths than on Earth. As a consequence, Martian basaltic volcanoes are also capable of erupting large quantities of ash in Plinian-style eruptions. In a Plinian eruption, hot ash is incorporated into the atmosphere, forming a huge convective column (cloud). If insufficient atmosphere is incorporated, the column may collapse to form pyroclastic flows. Plinian eruptions are rare in basaltic volcanoes on Earth where such eruptions are most commonly associated with silica-rich andesitic or rhyolitic magmas (e.g., Mount St. Helens).

Because the lower gravity of Mars generates less buoyancy forces on magma rising through the crust, the magma chambers that feed volcanoes on Mars are thought to be deeper and much larger than those on Earth. If a magma body on Mars is to reach close enough to the surface to erupt before solidifying, it must be big. Consequently, eruptions on Mars are less frequent than on Earth, but are of enormous scale and eruptive rate when they do occur. Somewhat paradoxically, the lower gravity of Mars also allows for longer and more widespread lava flows. Lava eruptions on Mars may be unimaginably huge. A vast lava flow the size of the state of Oregon has recently been described in western Elysium Planitia. The flow is believed to have been emplaced turbulently over the span of several weeks and thought to be one of the youngest lava flows on Mars.

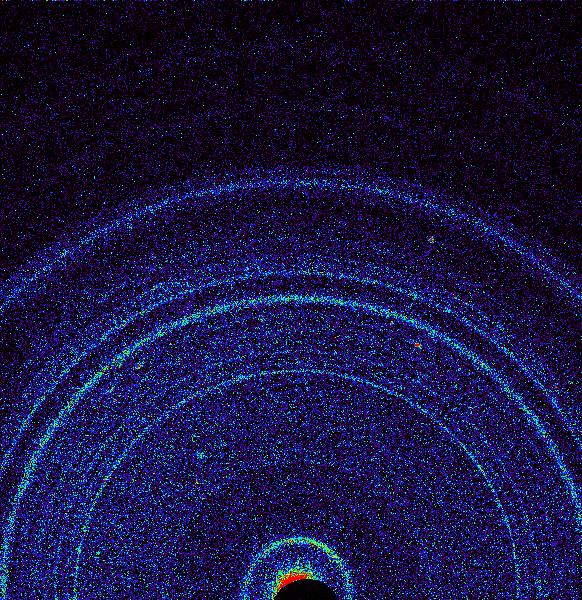
First X-ray diffraction view of Martian soil – CheMin analysis reveals minerals (including feldspar, pyroxenes and olivine) suggestive of "weathered basaltic soils" of volcanoes in Hawaii (Curiosity rover at "Rocknest", 2012). Each ring is a diffraction peak that corresponds to a specific atom-atom distance, which are unique enough to identify minerals. Smaller rings corresponds to larger features and vice versa.

The tectonic settings of volcanoes on Earth and Mars are very different. Most active volcanoes on Earth occur in long, linear chains along plate boundaries, either in zones where the lithosphere is spreading apart (divergent boundaries) or being subducted back into the mantle (convergent boundaries). Because Mars currently lacks plate tectonics, volcanoes there do not show the same global pattern as on Earth. Martian volcanoes are more analogous to terrestrial mid-plate volcanoes, such as those in the Hawaiian Islands, which are thought to have formed over a stationary mantle plume. (See hot spot.) The paragenetic tephra from a Hawaiian cinder cone has been mined to create Martian regolith simulant for researchers to use since 1998.

The largest and most conspicuous volcanoes on Mars occur in Tharsis and Elysium regions. These volcanoes are strikingly similar to shield volcanoes on Earth. Both have shallow-sloping flanks and summit calderas. The main difference between Martian shield volcanoes and those on Earth is in size: Martian shield volcanoes are truly colossal. For example, the tallest volcano on Mars, Olympus Mons, is 550 km across and 21 km high. It is nearly 100 times greater in volume than Mauna Loa in Hawaii, the largest active shield volcano on Earth. Geologists think one of the reasons that volcanoes on Mars are able to grow so large is because Mars lacks plate tectonics. The Martian lithosphere does not slide over the upper mantle (asthenosphere) as on Earth, so lava from a stationary hot spot is able to accumulate at one location on the surface for a billion years or longer.

In 2012, the Curiosity rover on the planet Mars at "Rocknest" performed the first X-ray diffraction analysis of Martian soil. The results from the rover's CheMin analyzer revealed the presence of several minerals, including feldspar, pyroxenes and olivine, and suggested that the Martian soil in the sample was similar to the "weathered basaltic soils" of volcanoes in Hawaii. In 2015, the same rover identified tridymite in a rock sample from Gale Crater, leading scientists to believe that silicic volcanism might have played a much more prevalent role in the planet's volcanic history than previously thought.

== Tharsis volcanic province ==
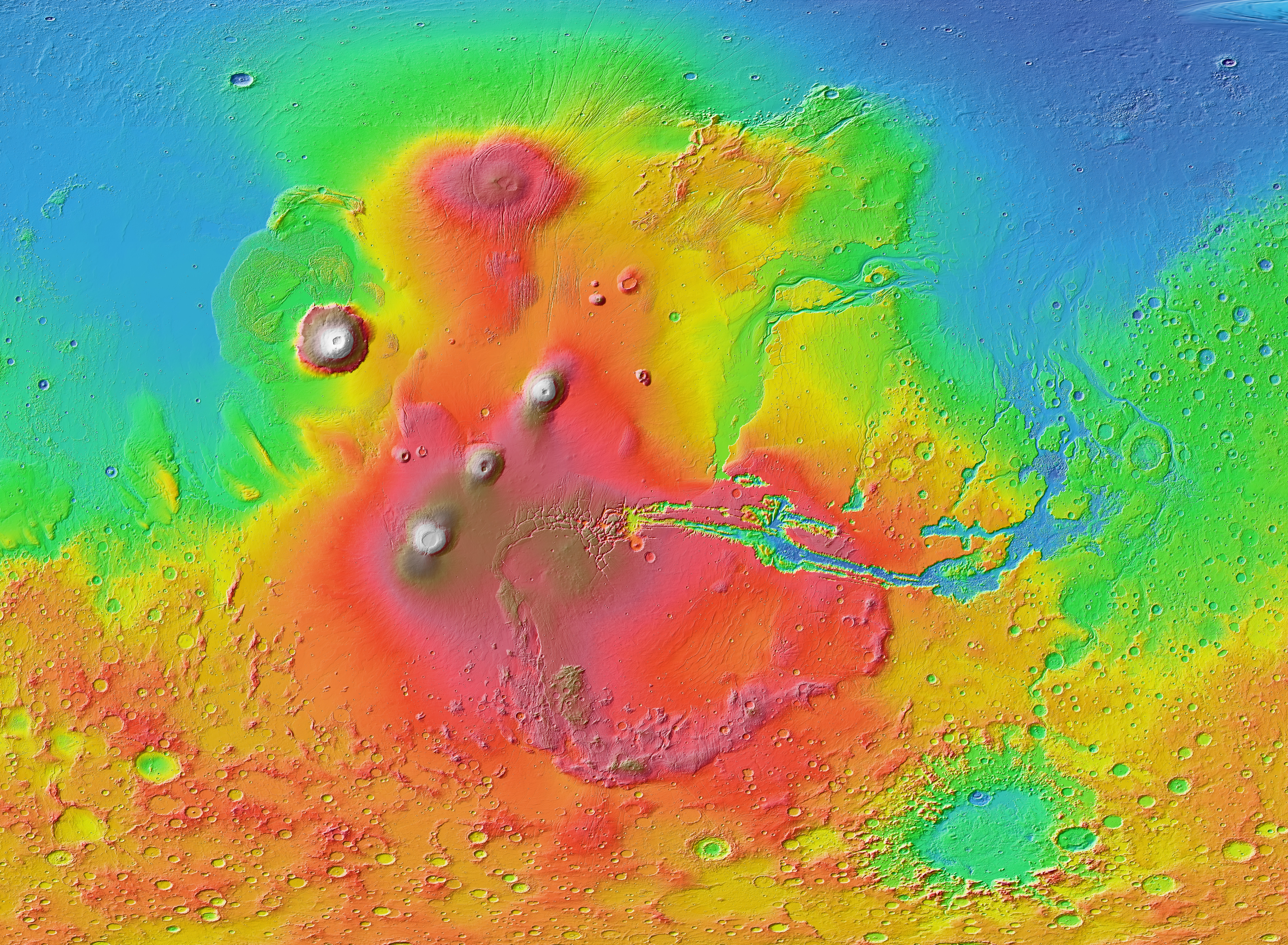
MOLA colorized shaded-relief map of western hemisphere of Mars showing Tharsis bulge (shades of red and brown). Tall volcanoes appear white.

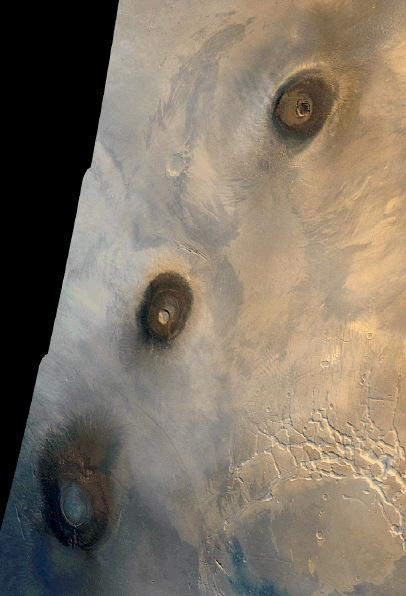
Viking orbiter image of the three Tharsis Montes: Arsia Mons (bottom), Pavonis Mons (center), and Ascraeus Mons (top)

The western hemisphere of Mars is dominated by a massive volcano-tectonic complex known as the Tharsis region or the Tharsis bulge. This immense, elevated structure is thousands of kilometers in diameter and covers up to 25% of the planet's surface. Averaging 7–10 km above datum (Martian "sea" level), Tharsis contains the highest elevations on the planet. Three enormous volcanoes, Ascraeus Mons, Pavonis Mons, and Arsia Mons (collectively known as the Tharsis Montes), sit aligned northeast–southwest along the crest of the bulge. The vast Alba Mons (formerly Alba Patera) occupies the northern part of the region. The huge shield volcano Olympus Mons lies off the main bulge, at the western edge of the province.

Built up by countless generations of lava flows and ash, the Tharsis bulge contains some of the youngest lava flows on Mars, but the bulge itself is believed to be very ancient. Geologic evidence indicates that most of the mass of Tharsis was in place by the end of the Noachian Period, about 3.7 billion years ago (Gya). Tharsis is so massive that it has placed tremendous stresses on the planet's lithosphere, generating immense extensional fractures (grabens and rift valleys) that extend halfway around the planet. The mass of Tharsis could have even altered the orientation of Mars' rotational axis, causing climate changes.

=== Tharsis Montes ===
Topographic map centered on Olympus and Tharsis

The three Tharsis Montes are shield volcanoes centered near the equator at longitude 247°E. All are several hundred kilometers in diameter and range in height from 14 to 18 km. Arsia Mons, the southernmost of the group, has a large summit caldera that is 130 kilometres (81 mi) across and 1.3 kilometres (0.81 mi) deep. Pavonis Mons, the middle volcano, has two nested calderas with the smaller one being almost 5 kilometres (3.1 mi) deep. Ascraeus Mons in the north, has a complex set of internested calderas and a long history of eruption that is believed to span most of Mars' history.

The three Tharsis Montes are about 700 kilometres (430 mi) apart. They show a distinctive northeast–southwest alignment that has been the source of some interest. Ceraunius Tholus and Uranius Mons follow the same trend to the northeast, and aprons of young lava flows on the flanks of all three Tharsis Montes are aligned in the same northeast–southwest orientation. This line clearly marks a major structural feature in the Martian crust, but its origin is uncertain.

=== Tholi and paterae ===
In addition to the large shield volcanoes, Tharsis contains a number of smaller volcanoes called tholi and paterae. The tholi are dome-shaped edifices with flanks that are much steeper than the larger Tharsis shields. Their central calderas are also quite large in proportion to their base diameters. The density of impact craters on many of the tholi indicate they are older than the large shields, having formed between late Noachian and early Hesperian times. Ceraunius Tholus and Uranius Tholus have densely channeled flanks, suggesting that the flank surfaces are made up of easily erodible material, such as ash. The age and morphology of the tholi provide strong evidence that the tholi represent the summits of old shield volcanoes that have been largely buried by great thicknesses of younger lava flows. By one estimate the Tharsis tholi may be buried by up to 4 km of lava.

Patera (pl. paterae) is Latin for a shallow drinking bowl. The term was applied to certain ill-defined, scalloped-edged craters that appeared in early spacecraft images to be large volcanic calderas. The smaller paterae in Tharsis appear to be morphologically similar to the tholi, except for having larger calderas. Like the tholi, the Tharsis paterae probably represent the tops of larger, now buried shield volcanoes. Historically, the term patera has been used to describe the entire edifice of certain volcanoes on Mars (e.g., Alba Patera). In 2007, the International Astronomical Union (IAU) redefined the terms Alba Patera, Uranius Patera, and Ulysses Patera to refer only to the central calderas of these volcanoes.

=== Olympus Mons ===
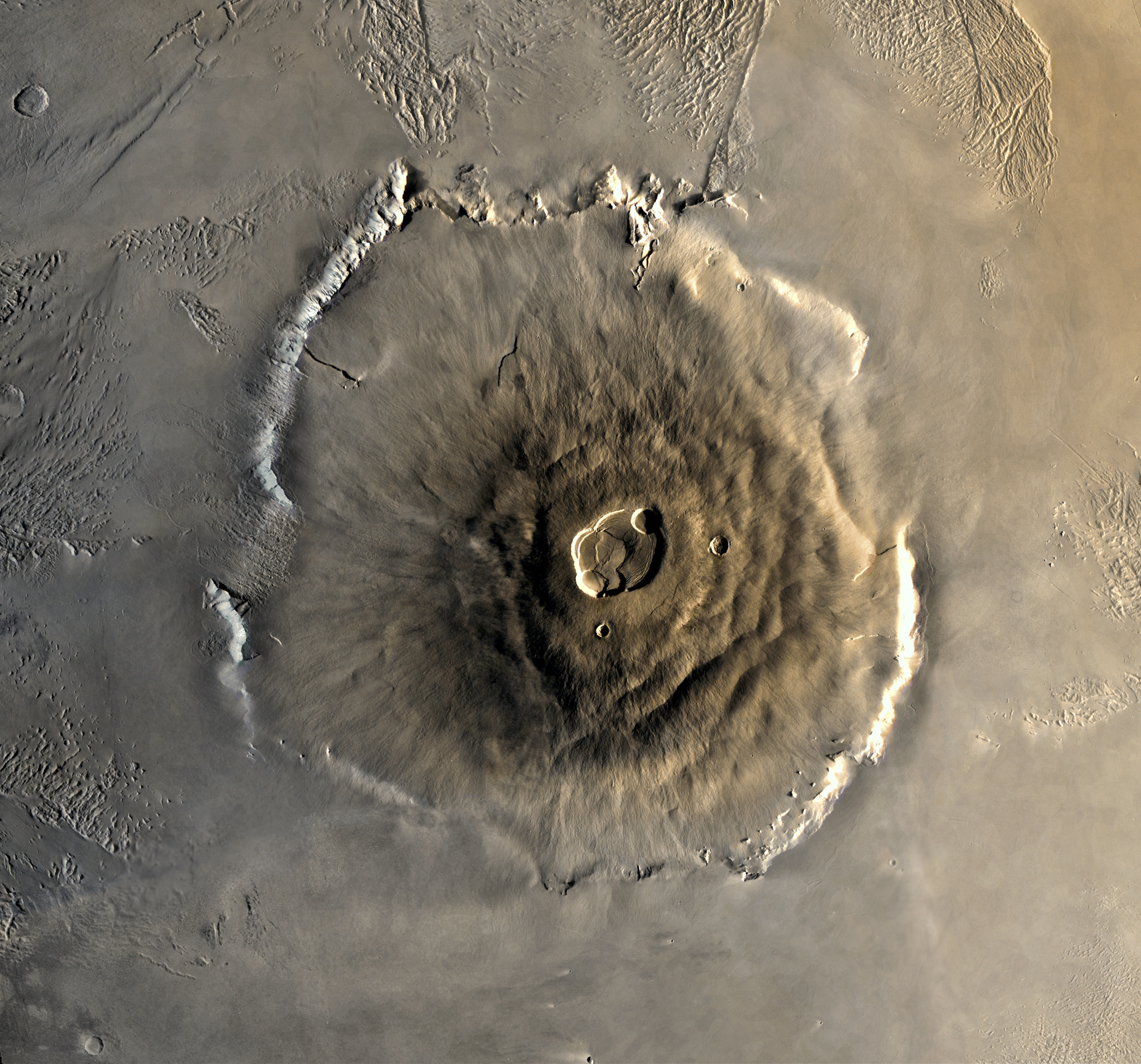
Wide view of the Olympus Mons aureole, escarpment and caldera

Olympus Mons is the youngest and tallest large volcano on Mars. It is located 1200 km northwest of the Tharsis Montes, just off the western edge of the Tharsis bulge. Its summit is 21 km above datum (Mars "sea" level) and has a central caldera complex consisting of six nested calderas that together form a depression 72 x 91 km wide and 3.2 km deep. As a shield volcano, it has an extremely low profile with shallow slopes averaging between 4–5 degrees. The volcano was built up by many thousands of individual flows of highly fluid lava. An irregular escarpment, in places up to 8 km tall, lies at the base of the volcano, forming a kind of pedestal on which the volcano sits. At various locations around the volcano, immense lava flows can be seen extending into the adjacent plains, burying the escarpment. In medium resolution images (100 m/pixel), the surface of the volcano has a fine radial texture due to the innumerable flows and leveed lava channels that line its flanks.

=== Alba Mons (Alba Patera) ===
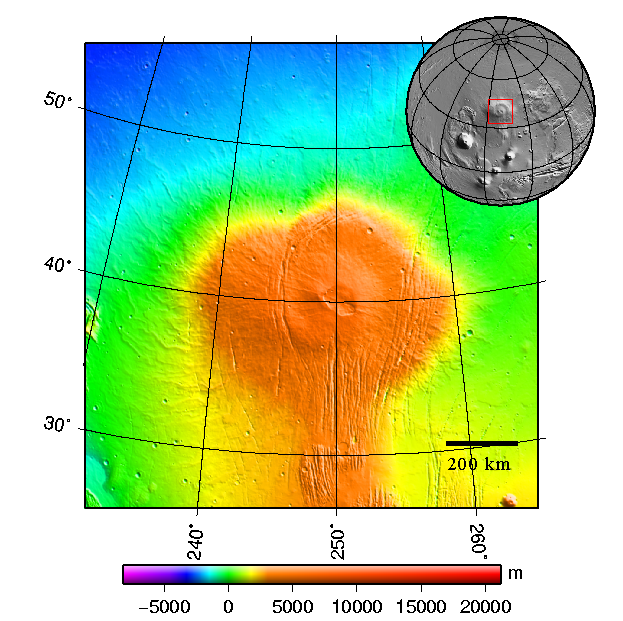
MOLA shaded-relief maps showing location of Alba Mons.

Alba Mons, located in the northern Tharsis region, is a unique volcanic structure, with no counterpart on Earth or elsewhere on Mars. The flanks of the volcano have extremely low slopes characterized by extensive lava flows and channels. The average flank slope on Alba Mons is only about 0.5°, over five times lower than the slopes on the other Tharsis volcanoes. The volcano has a central edifice 350 km wide and 1.5 km high with a double caldera complex at the summit. Surrounding the central edifice is an incomplete ring of fractures. Flows related to the volcano can be traced as far north as 61°N and as far south as 26°N. If one counts these widespread flow fields, the volcano stretches an immense 2000 km north–south and 3000 km east–west, making it one of the most areally extensive volcanic features in the Solar System. Most geological models suggest that Alba Mons is composed of highly fluid basaltic lava flows, but some researchers have identified possible pyroclastic deposits on the volcano's flanks. Because Alba Mons lies antipodal to the Hellas impact basin, some researchers have conjectured that the volcano's formation may have been related to crustal weakening from the Hellas impact, which produced strong seismic waves that focused on the opposite side of the planet.

== Elysium volcanic province ==
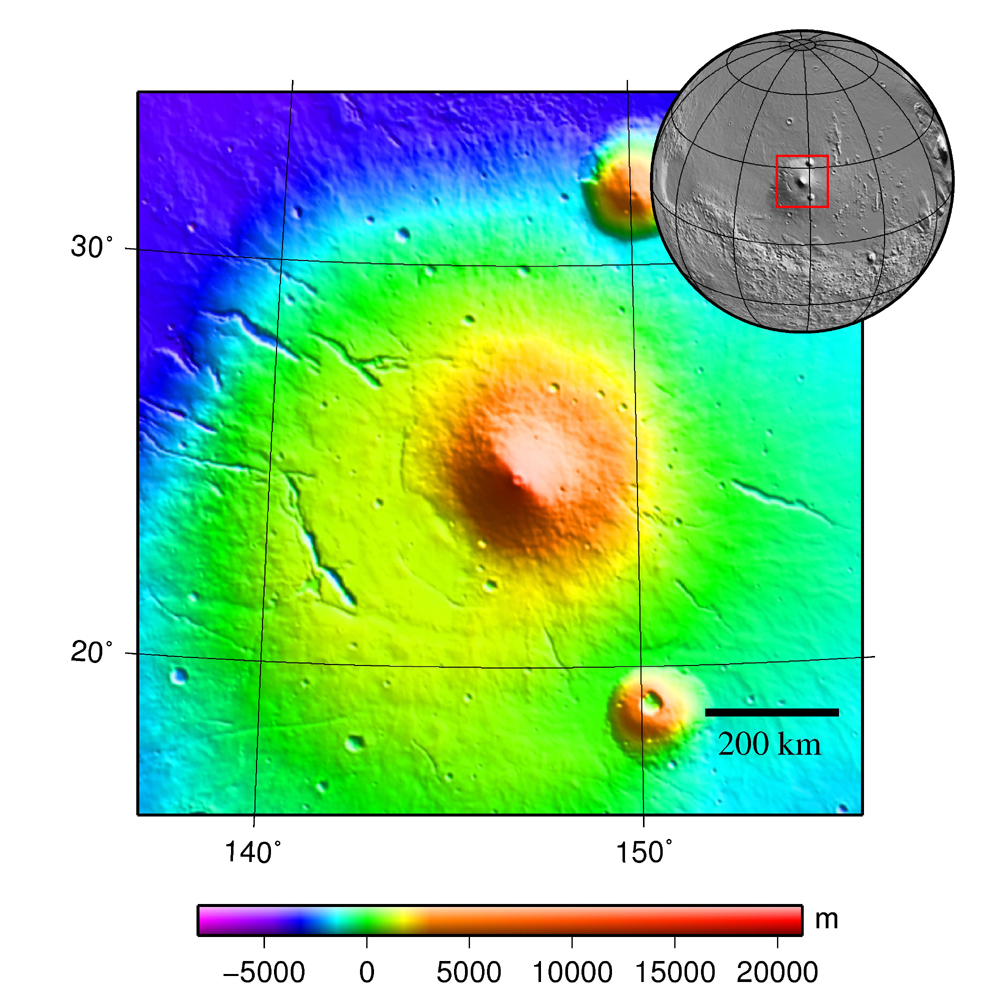
MOLA view of Elysium province. Elysium Mons is in the center. Albor Tholus and Hecates Tholus are at bottom and top, respectively.

A smaller volcanic center lies several thousand kilometers west of Tharsis in Elysium. The Elysium volcanic complex is about 2,000 kilometers in diameter and consists of three main volcanoes, Elysium Mons, Hecates Tholus, and Albor Tholus. The northwestern edge of the province is characterized by large channels (Granicus and Tinjar Valles) that emerge from several grabens on the flanks of Elysium Mons. The grabens may have formed from subsurface dikes. The dikes may have fractured the cryosphere, releasing large volumes of ground water to form the channels. Associated with the channels are widespread sedimentary deposits that may have formed from mudflows or lahars. The Elysium group of volcanoes is thought to be somewhat different from the Tharsis Montes, in that development of the former involved both lavas and pyroclastics.

Elysium Mons is the largest volcanic edifice in the province. It is 375 km across (depending on how one defines the base) and 14 km high. It has single, simple caldera at its summit that measures 14 km wide and 100 m deep. The volcano is distinctly conical in profile, leading some to call it a stratocone; however, given the predominantly low slopes, it is probably a shield. Elysium Mons is only about one-fifth the volume of Arsia Mons.

Hecates Tholus is 180 km across and 4.8 km high. The slopes of the volcano are heavily dissected with channels, suggesting that the volcano is composed of easily erodible material such as volcanic ash. The origin of the channels is unknown; they have been attributed to lava, ash flows, or even water from snow or rainfall. Albor Tholus, the southernmost of the Elysium volcanoes, is 150 km in diameter and 4.1 km high. Its slopes are smoother and less heavily cratered than the slopes of the other Elysium volcanoes.

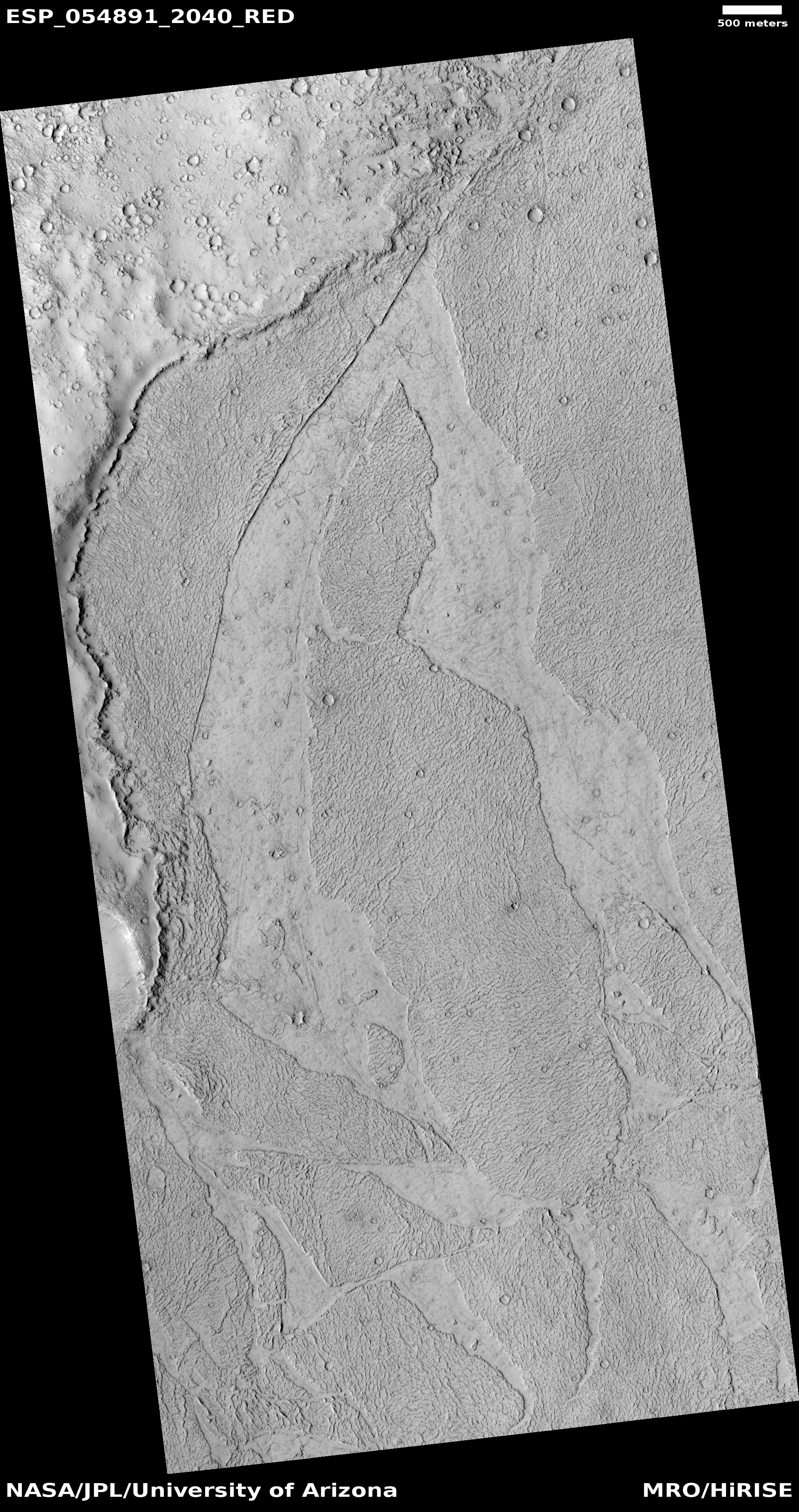
Lava rafts, as seen by HiRISE under HiWish program. Location is the Elysium quadrangle.

== Syrtis Major ==
Syrtis Major Planum is a vast Hesperian-aged shield volcano located within the albedo feature bearing the same name. The volcano is 1200 km in diameter but only 2 km high. It has two calderas, Meroe Patera and Nili Patera. Studies involving the regional gravity field suggest a solidified magma chamber at least 5 km thick lies under the surface. Syrtis Major is of interest to geologists because dacite and granite have been detected there from orbiting spacecraft. Dacites and granites are silica-rich rocks that crystallize from a magma that is more chemically evolved and differentiated than basalt. They may form at the top of a magma chamber after the heavy minerals, such as olivine and pyroxene (those containing iron and magnesium), have settled to the bottom. Dacites and granites are very common on Earth but rare on Mars.

== Arabia Terra ==
Arabia Terra is a large upland region in the north of Mars that lies mostly in the Arabia quadrangle. Several irregularly shaped craters found within the region represent a type of highland volcanic construct which, all together, represent a martian igneous province. Low-relief paterae within the region possess a range of geomorphic features, including structural collapse, effusive volcanism and explosive eruptions, that are similar to terrestrial supervolcanoes. The enigmatic highland ridged plains in the region may have been formed, in part, by the related flow of lavas.

== Highland paterae ==
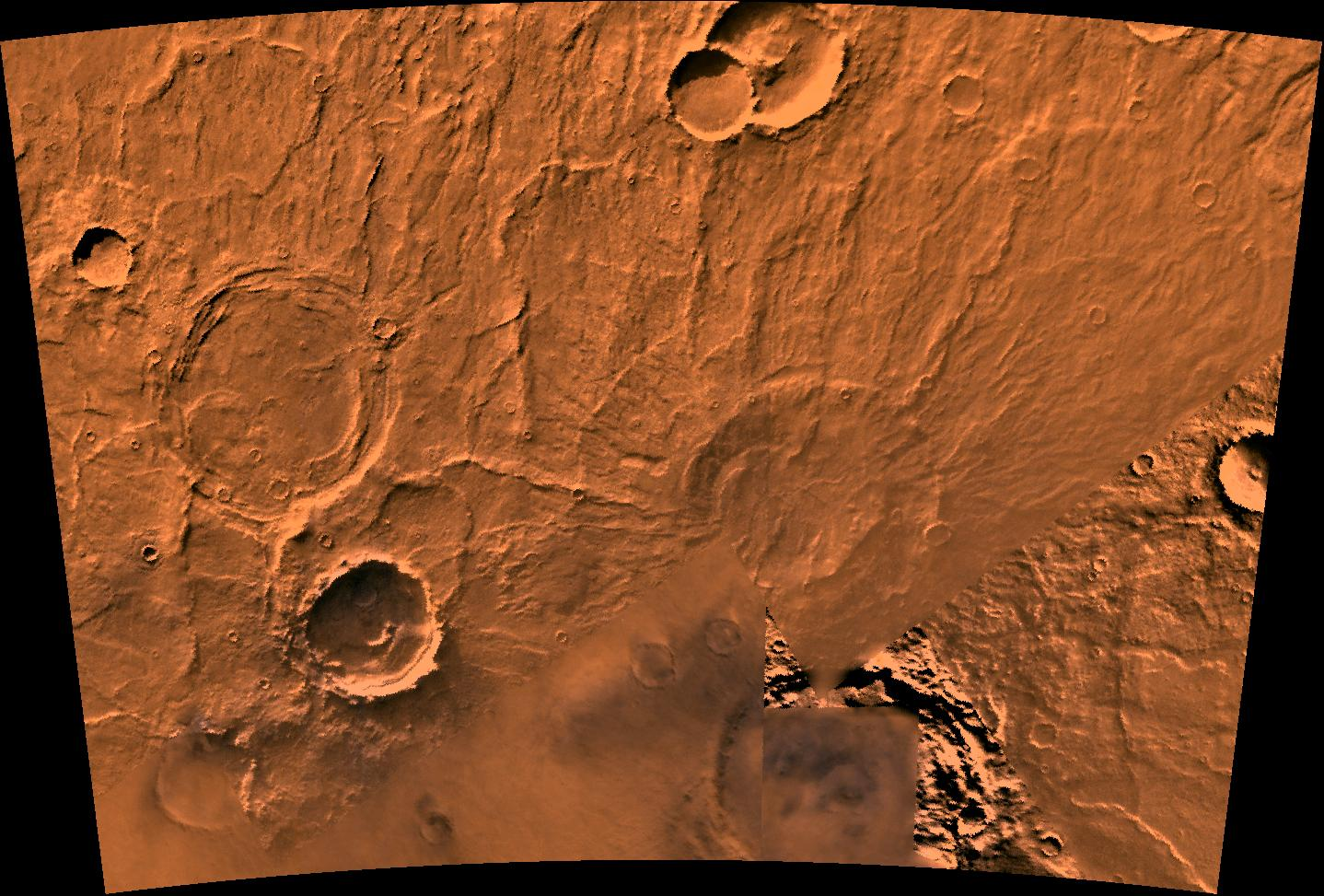
Viking orbiter view of Peneus Patera (left) and Amphitrites Patera (right). Both are ancient volcanic edifices southwest of Hellas.

In the southern hemisphere, particularly around the Hellas impact basin, are several flat-lying volcanic structures called highland paterae These volcanoes are some of the oldest identifiable volcanic edifices on Mars. They are characterized by having extremely low profiles with highly eroded ridges and channels that radiate outward from a degraded, central caldera complex. They include Tyrrhena Patera, Hadriaca Patera to the northeast of Hellas and Amphitrites Patera, Peneus Patera, Malea Patera and Pityusa Patera to the southwest of Hellas. Geomorphologic evidence suggests that the highland patera were produced through a combination of lava flows and pyroclastics from the interaction of magma with water. Some researchers speculate that the location of the highland paterae around Hellas is due to deep-seated fractures caused by the impact that provided conduits for magma to rise to the surface. Although they are not very high, some paterae cover large areas—Amphritrites Patera, for example, covers a larger area than Olympus Mons while Pityusa Patera, the largest, has a caldera nearly large enough to fit Olympus Mons inside it.

== Volcanic plains ==
Volcanic plains are widespread on Mars. Two types of plains are commonly recognized: those where lava flow features are common, and those where flow features are generally absent but a volcanic origin is inferred by other characteristics. Plains with abundant lava flow features occur in and around the large volcanic provinces of Tharsis and Elysium. Flow features include both sheet flow and tube- and channel-fed flow morphologies. Sheet flows show complex, overlapping flow lobes and may extend for many hundreds of kilometers from their source areas. Lava flows can form a lava tube when the exposed upper layers of lava cool and solidify to form a roof while the lava underneath continues flowing. Often, when all the remaining lava leaves the tube, the roof collapses to make a channel or line of pit craters (catena).

An unusual type of flow feature occurs in the Cerberus plains south of Elysium and in Amazonis. These flows have a broken platey texture, consisting of dark, kilometer-scale slabs embedded in a light-toned matrix. They have been attributed to rafted slabs of solidified lava floating on a still-molten subsurface. Others have claimed the broken slabs represent pack ice that froze over a sea that pooled in the area after massive releases of groundwater from the Cerberus Fossae area.

The second type of volcanic plains (ridged plains) are characterized by abundant wrinkle ridges. Volcanic flow features are rare or absent. The ridged plains are believed to be regions of extensive flood basalts, by analogy with the lunar maria. Ridged plains make up about 30% of the Martian surface and are most prominent in Lunae, Hesperia, and Malea Plana, as well as throughout much of the northern lowlands. Ridged plains are all Hesperian in age and represent a style of volcanism globally predominant during that time period. The Hesperian Period is named after the ridged plains in Hesperia Planum.

== Potential current volcanism ==
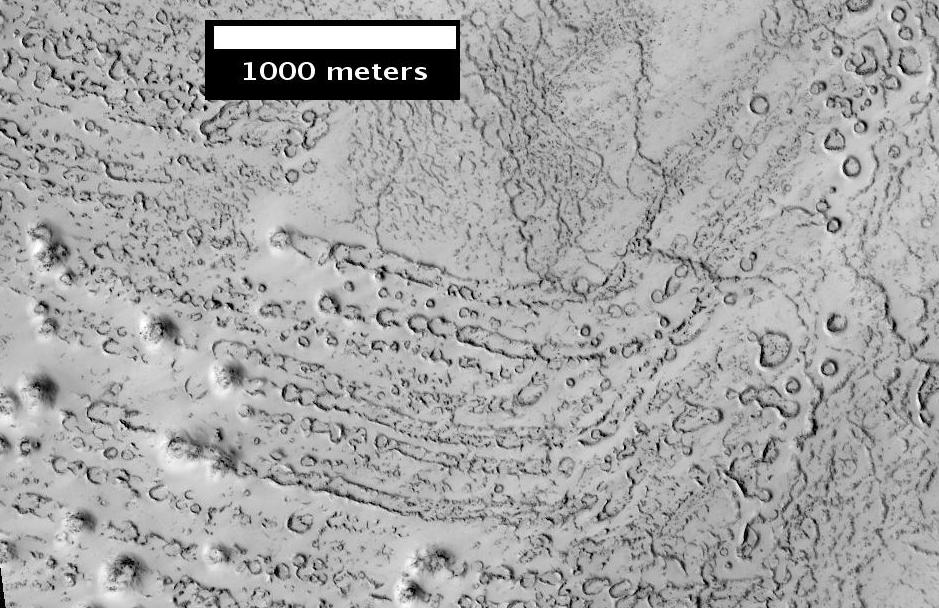
HiRISE image of possible rootless cones east of Elysium region. The chains of rings are interpreted to be caused by steam explosions when lava moved over ground that was rich in water ice.

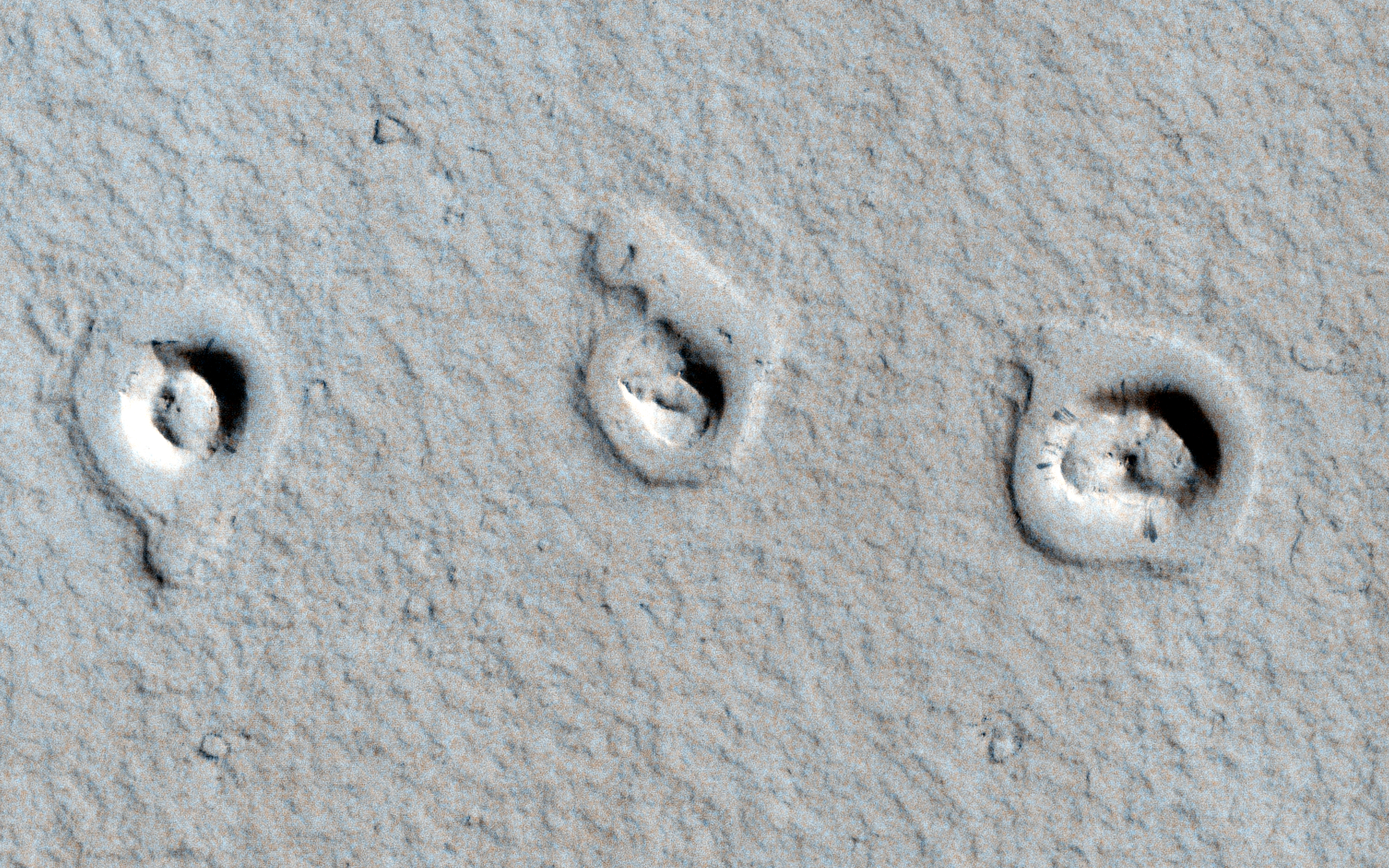
"Rootless Cones" on Mars – due to lava flows interacting with water (MRO, 4 January 2013) (21.965°N 197.807°E)

Scientists have never recorded an active volcano eruption on the surface of Mars; moreover, searches for thermal signatures and surface changes before 2011 did not yield any positive evidence for active volcanism.

However, the European Space Agency's Mars Express orbiter photographed lava flows interpreted in 2004 to have occurred within the past two million years, suggesting a relatively recent geologic activity. An updated study in 2011 estimated that the youngest lava flows occurred in the last few tens of millions of years. The authors consider this age makes it possible that Mars is not yet volcanically extinct.

The InSight lander mission would determine if there is any seismic activity, measure the amount of heat flow from the interior, estimate the size of Mars' core and whether the core is liquid or solid. The findings were that Mars possesses a molten outer core and a solid inner core with a partially molten mantle.

In 2020, astronomers reported evidence for volcanic activity on Mars as recently as 53,000 years ago in the Cerberus Fossae amid Elysium Planitia. Such activity could have provided the environment, in terms of energy and chemicals, needed to support life forms.

Alba Mons may have an environment similar to hydrothermal vents on Earth. Some scientists believe such places gave rise to life on Earth. The evidence, reported in November, 2026, was the detection of a noxious gas found seeping through cracks on Mars. Europe's ExoMars Trace Gas Orbiter (TGO) spacecraft spotted a possible signal of hydrogen chloride gas leaking from rifts in the region of Alba Mons. It is the largest volcano on Mars in terms of surface area. Olympus Mons is the largest volcano in terms of height. Scientists surmise that this gas originates from hot magma below the regolith of Mars. This instrument first found hydrogen chloride gas in Mars' atmosphere in 2021. The gas appeared to be seasonal, its distribution was not localized at a possible volcanic region, and other signs of volcanic gases, like sulfur, were not present. However, later observations suggested that the gas wasn't just appearing in the warmer spring and summer in Mars' southern hemisphere; it also was found in the winter in the northern hemisphere. The team also discovered fresh and narrow (<1 meter) cracks in this area. These could be HCl pathways sourced into magmatic bodies at depth.

=== Volcanoes and ice ===
Large amounts of water ice are believed to be present in the Martian subsurface. The interaction of ice with molten rock can produce distinct landforms. On Earth, when hot volcanic material comes into contact with surface ice, large amounts of liquid water and mud may form that flow catastrophically down slope as massive debris flows (lahars). Some channels in Martian volcanic areas, such as Hrad Vallis near Elysium Mons, may have been similarly carved or modified by lahars. Lava flowing over water-saturated ground can cause the water to erupt violently in an explosion of steam (see phreatic eruption), producing small volcano-like landforms called pseudocraters, or rootless cones. These rootless cones are very common in a number of areas of Mars. Features that resemble terrestrial rootless cones occur in Elysium, Amazonis, and Isidis and Chryse Planitiae. Also, phreatomagmatism produce tuff rings or tuff cones on Earth and existence of similar landforms on Mars is expected too. Their existence was suggested from Nepenthes/Amenthes region. Finally, when a volcano erupts under an ice sheet, it can form a distinct, mesa-like landform called a tuya or table mountain. Some researchers cite geomorphic evidence that many of the layered interior deposits in Valles Marineris may be the Martian equivalent of tuyas.

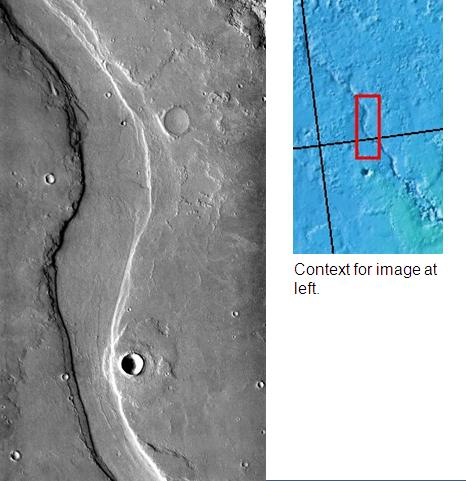
THEMIS image of Hrad Vallis. This valley may have formed when eruptions in the Elysium Mons volcanic complex melted ground or surface ice.

== Tectonic boundaries ==
Tectonic boundaries have been discovered on Mars. Valles Marineris is a horizontally sliding tectonic boundary that divides two major partial or complete plates of Mars. The recent finding suggests that Mars is geologically active with occurrences in the millions of years. There has been previous evidence of Mars' geologic activity. The Mars Global Surveyor (MGS) discovered magnetic stripes in the crust of Mars, especially in the Phaethontis and Eridania quadrangles. The magnetometer on MGS discovered 100 km wide stripes of magnetized crust running roughly parallel for up to 2000 km. These stripes alternate in polarity with the north magnetic pole of one pointing up from the surface and the north magnetic pole of the next pointing down. When similar stripes were discovered on Earth in the 1960s, they were taken as evidence of plate tectonics. However, there are some differences, between the magnetic stripes on Earth and those on Mars. The Martian stripes are wider, much more strongly magnetized, and do not appear to spread out from a middle crustal spreading zone. Because the area with the magnetic stripes is about 4 billion years old, it is believed that the global magnetic field probably lasted for only the first few hundred million years of Mars' life. At that time the temperature of the molten iron in the planet's core might have been high enough to mix it into a magnetic dynamo. Younger rock does not show any stripes. When molten rock containing magnetic material, such as hematite (Fe_{2}O_{3}), cools and solidifies in the presence of a magnetic field, it becomes magnetized and takes on the polarity of the background field. This magnetism is lost only if the rock is subsequently heated above the Curie temperature, which is 770 °C for pure iron, but lower for oxides such as hematite (approximately 650 °C) or magnetite (approximately 580 °C). The magnetism left in rocks is a record of the magnetic field when the rock solidified.

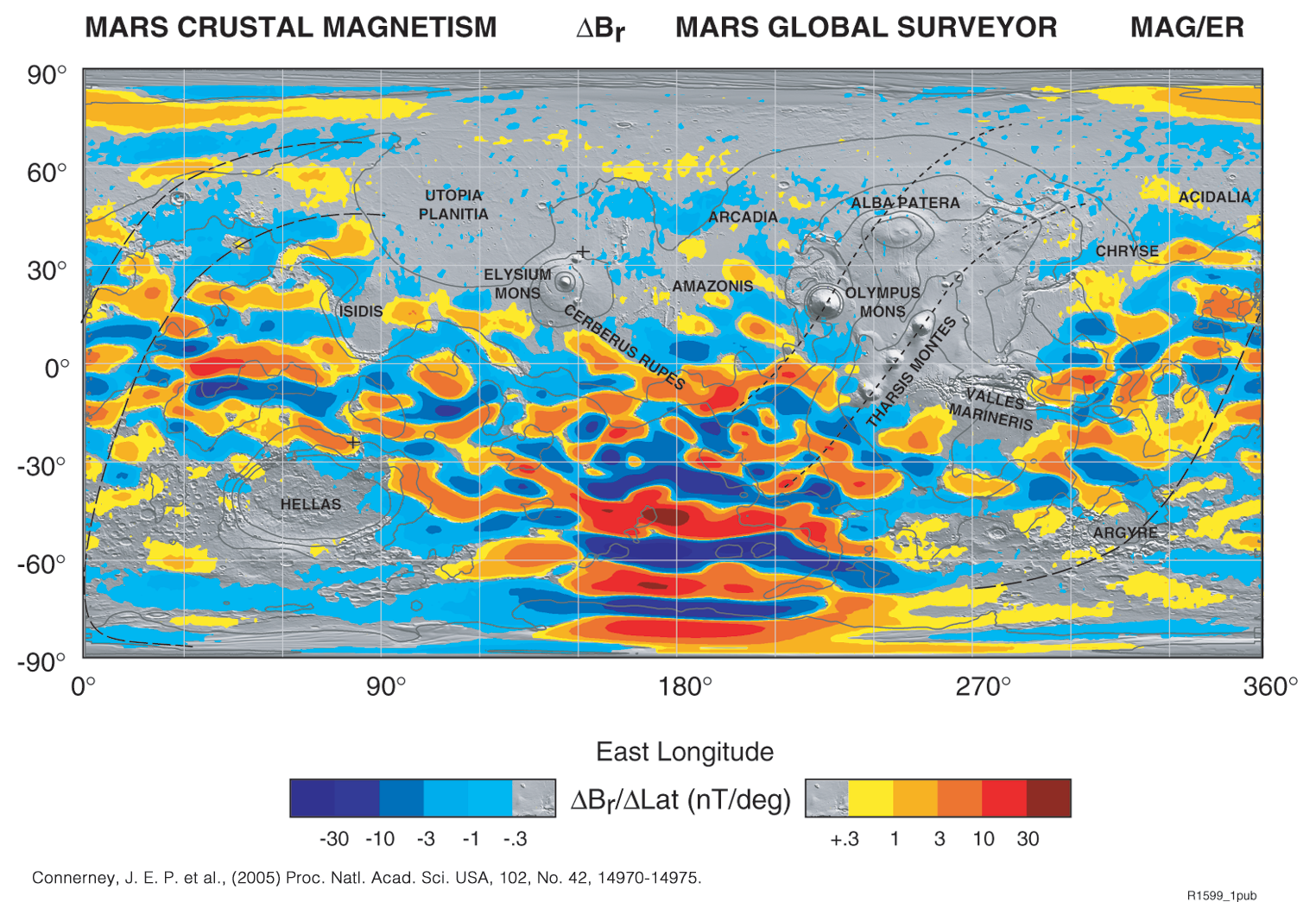
Mars crustal magnetism

Mars' volcanic features can be likened to Earth's geologic hotspots. Pavonis Mons is the middle of three volcanoes (collectively known as Tharsis Montes) on the Tharsis bulge near the equator of the planet Mars. The other Tharsis volcanoes are Ascraeus Mons and Arsia Mons. The three Tharsis Montes, together with some smaller volcanoes to the north, form a straight line. This arrangement suggests that they were formed by a crustal plate moving over a hot spot. Such an arrangement exists in the Earth's Pacific Ocean as the Hawaiian Islands. The Hawaiian Islands are in a straight line, with the youngest in the south and the oldest in the north. So geologists believe the plate is moving while a stationary plume of hot magma rises and punches through the crust to produce volcanic mountains. However, the largest volcano on the planet, Olympus Mons, is thought to have formed when the plates were not moving. Olympus Mons may have formed just after the plate motion stopped. The mare-like plains on Mars are roughly 3 to 3.5 billion years old. The giant shield volcanoes are younger, formed between 1 and 2 billion years ago. Olympus Mons may be "as young as 200 million years."

In 1994, Norman H. Sleep, professor of geophysics at Stanford University, described how the three volcanoes that form a line along the Tharsis Ridge may be extinct island arc volcanoes like the island chain of Japan.

== See also ==
- Geology of Mars – Geology of fourth planet from the Sun
- Geysers on Mars – Putative CO2 gas and dust eruptions on Mars
- Marsquake – Seismic event occurring on Mars
- Volcanism on Venus – Overview of volcanic activity on the planet Venus
- Volcanism on Io – Volcanism of Io, a moon of Jupiter
- Water on Mars
- Olympus Mons

== Bibliography ==
- Carr, Michael H. (2006). The Surface of Mars. New York: Cambridge University Press. ISBN 978-0-521-87201-0.
- Boyce, J.M. (2008). The Smithsonian Book of Mars. Old Saybrook, CT: Konecky & Konecky. ISBN 978-1-58834-074-0.
