= Aonia Mons =

Mountain on Mars

- Feature type: Mons
- Location: Aonia Terra, Mars
- Coordinates: 53.33°S 272.08°E
- Diameter: 27.07 km (16.82 mi)
- Naming: 4 March 2013
- Eponym: Aonia, Greece

Aonia Mons is a mons, or small mountain, located in the Aonia Terra region of the southern hemisphere of Mars. The crater was named after Aonia, the eponymous settlement in Ancient Greece. The name "Aonia Mons" was officially approved by the International Astronomical Union (IAU) on 4 March 2013.

== Geology and characteristics ==
Classified as a mons, Aonia Mons is 27.07 kilometres (16.82 mi) in diameter, and is located at 53.33°S 272.08°E, near the Sinai planum.

== See also ==
- List of mountains on Mars
