= Geryon (disambiguation) =

Geryon is a giant in Greek mythology.

Geryon may also refer to:

- Geryon (crab), a genus of crabs
- Geryon Montes, a mountain range on the planet Mars
- Geryon (Devil May Cry), a demon steed in the video game Devil May Cry 3
