= Galaxius =

Galaxius may refer to:

- Epithet of Apollo in Boeotia, derived from a stream Galaxius
- Galaxius (Γαλάξιος), a small river in Boeotia, near the temple of Apollo Galaxius. The name is derived from the fact that its waters were of the colour of milk (γάλα), due to the chalky nature of the soil.
- Galaxius Mons on planet Mars
