= Tanaica Montes =

Mountain range on Mars

- Coordinates: 39.55°N 269.17°E

Tanaica Montes is a mountain range on the planet Mars. It has a diameter of 177 kilometres (110 mi).

The name Tanaica Montes is a classical albedo name. This was approved by International Astronomical Union in 1991.

== See also ==
- List of mountains on Mars
