= Octantis Mons =

Mountain on Mars

- Coordinates: 54.93°S 318.77°E

Octantis Mons is a mountain on the planet Mars. The name Octantis Mons is a classical albedo name. It has a diameter of 19.09 km Kilometer. This mountain's definition was approved by International Astronomical Union in 1991.

== See also ==
- List of mountains on Mars
