= Coronae Montes =

Mountain on the planet Mars

- Coordinates: 34.31°S 86.11°E

Coronae Montes is a mountain on the planet Mars. The name Coronae Montesis a classical albedo name. It has a diameter of 236 kilometres (147 mi). This was approved by International Astronomical Union in 1991.

== See also ==
- List of mountains on Mars
