= Gonnus Mons =

Mountain on Mars

- Coordinates: 41.21°N 269.12°E
- Peak: 2,890 metres (9,482 ft)

Gonnus Mons is a large mountain on the planet Mars. The name Gonnus Mons is a classical albedo name. It has a diameter of 57 kilometres (35 mi) and a peak of 2,890 metres (9,482 ft). This was approved by International Astronomical Union in 1991.

== See also ==
- List of mountains on Mars
