= Xanthe Montes =

Montes on Mars

- Coordinates: 18.13°N 305.08°E

Xanthe Montes is a mountain range on the planet Mars. The name Xanthe Montes is a classical albedo feature name. It has a diameter of 500 kilometres (311 mi). This was approved by International Astronomical Union in 2006.

== See also ==
- List of mountains on Mars
