= Euripus Mons =

Mons on Mars

- Coordinates: 44.82°S 105.18°E
- Peak: 4,480 metres (14,698 ft)
- Eponym: Latin – Euripus Mons – classical albedo feature name

Euripus Mons is a mountain on the planet Mars. The name Euripus Mons is a classical albedo name. It has a diameter of 91 kilometres (57 mi) and an elevation of 4,480 metres (14,698 ft). This was approved by International Astronomical Union in 2003. It is just east of Hellas Basin and is surrounded by debris flow.

== See also ==
- List of mountains on Mars
