= Tartarus Montes =

Mountain range on Mars

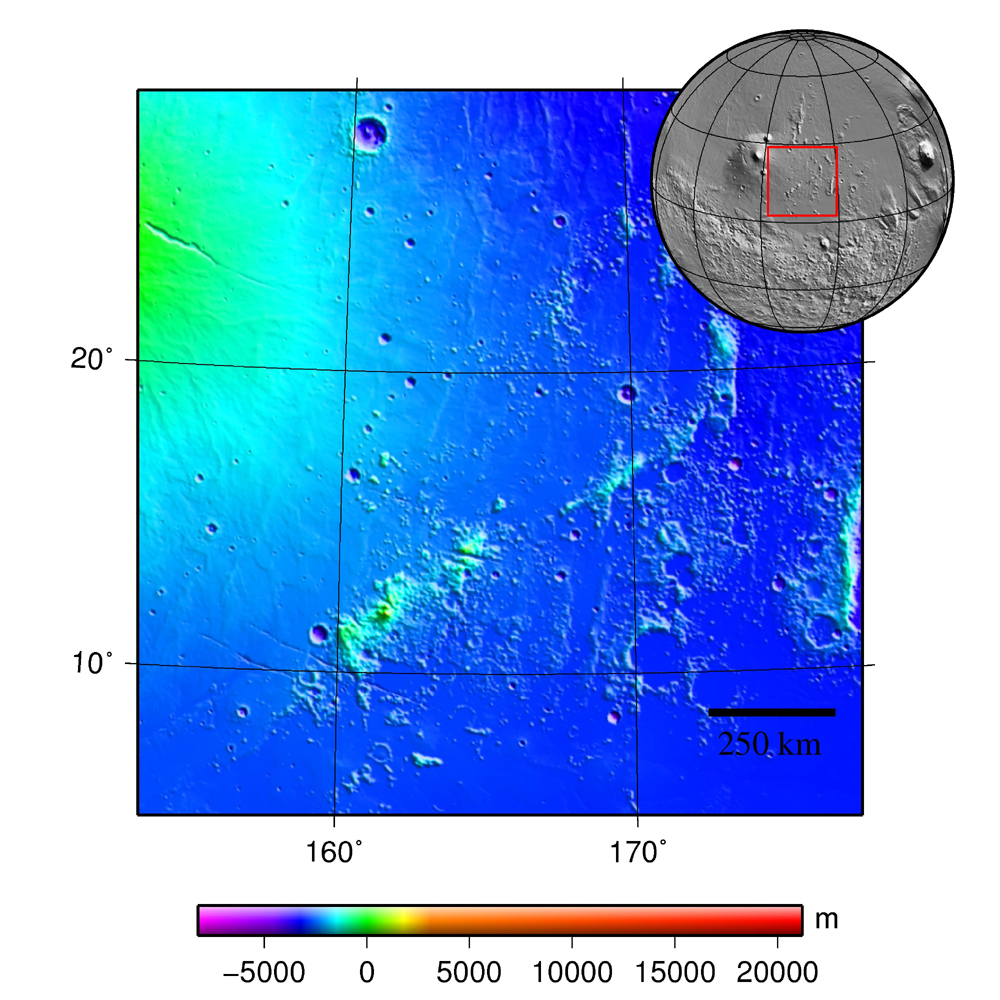
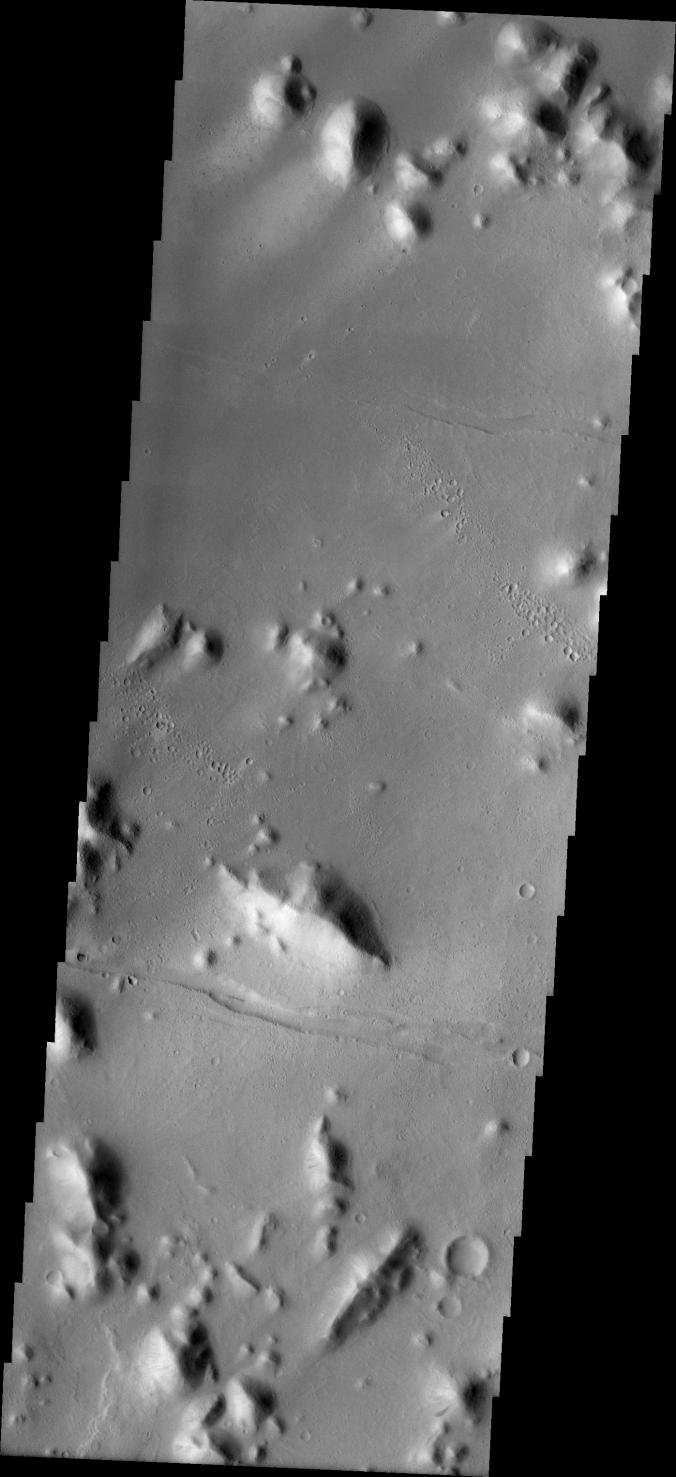
- Tartarus Montes
- Location: Between Orcus Patera and the Elysium volcanic region
- Coordinates: 15.46°N 167.54°E

The Tartarus Montes are a mountain range on the planet Mars, stretching over 1070 km and located around the coordinates 15.46º N, 167.54º E, between Orcus Patera and the Elysium volcanic region.

Albedo was first identified from the contrast of bright and dark signals photographed by Eugène Antoniadi.

== Etymology ==
The mountain range was named in 1985. It has been named after Greek deity of the underworld, Tartarus, by the standard planetary nomenclature for Martian landforms. According to Greek myth, Tartarus is the lowest part of Hades. Zeus imprisoned the Titans in Tartarus. The second part of the name "Montes" means mountains.

== Features ==
Photographs taken by the Mars Global Surveyor indicate that there are cones and volcanic rings near the Tartarus Montes. Narrow grabens and fractures are present around the regions of this mountain range. Both the hilly areas and the intervening plains are cut with similar marks. This implies that there is a widespread tensional fracture system associated with Cerberus Fossae. At one point, Grjota’ Vallis, an outflow channel, crosses the bedrock ridge of the Tartarus Montes.

== See also ==
- List of mountains on Mars
