= Chalce Montes =

Mountain range on the planet Mars

- Coordinates: 53.72°S 322.35°E
- Length: 95 km

Chalce Montes is a mountain range on the planet Mars. The name refers to the Martian albedo feature Chalce, that was named after the Greek island Chalki. It has a diameter of 95 kilometres (59 mi); its elevation is 2,300 metres (7,500 ft).

== See also ==
- List of mountains on Mars
