= Jovis Tholus =

Martian geographical feature

- THEMIS daytime IR mosaic of Jovis Tholus.
- Coordinates: 18.41°N 117.41°W
- Peak: 2,990 metres (9,810 ft)

Jovis Tholus is a volcano in the Tharsis quadrangle of Mars located at 18.41° N and 117.41° W. It is 58.0 km across and was named after a classical albedo feature name. It has an elevation of 2,990 metres (9,810 ft).

It has a 28 km diameter caldera of five craters. 60 km away from the caldera is a 30 km diameter impact crater.

== Gallery ==
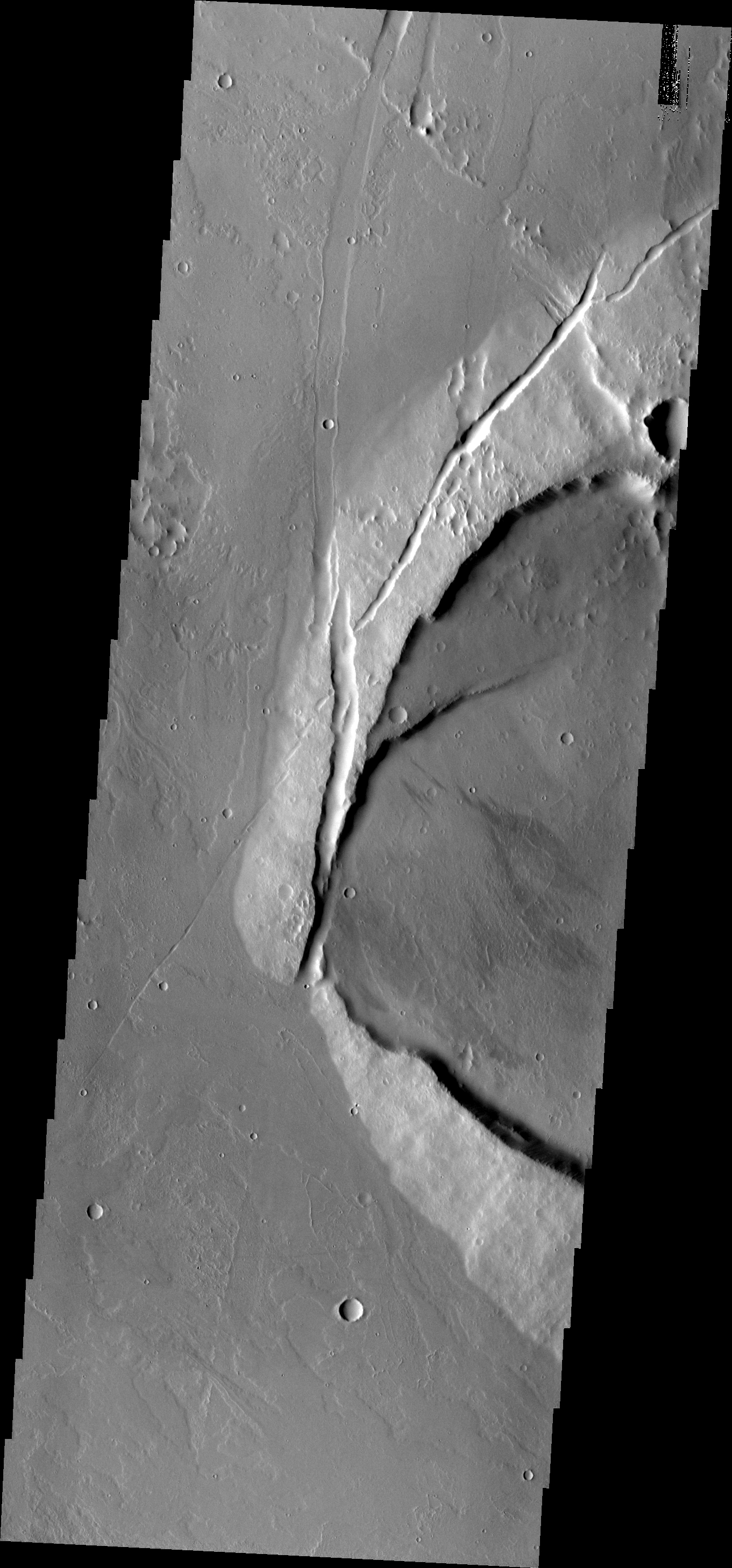
Western part of Jovis Tholus, as seen by THEMIS.

== See also ==
- Geology of Mars
- List of mountains on Mars by height
- Volcanoes on Mars
- Volcanology of Mars
