= Hellas Montes =

Mountain range on Mars

- Coordinates: 37.63°S 97.61°E

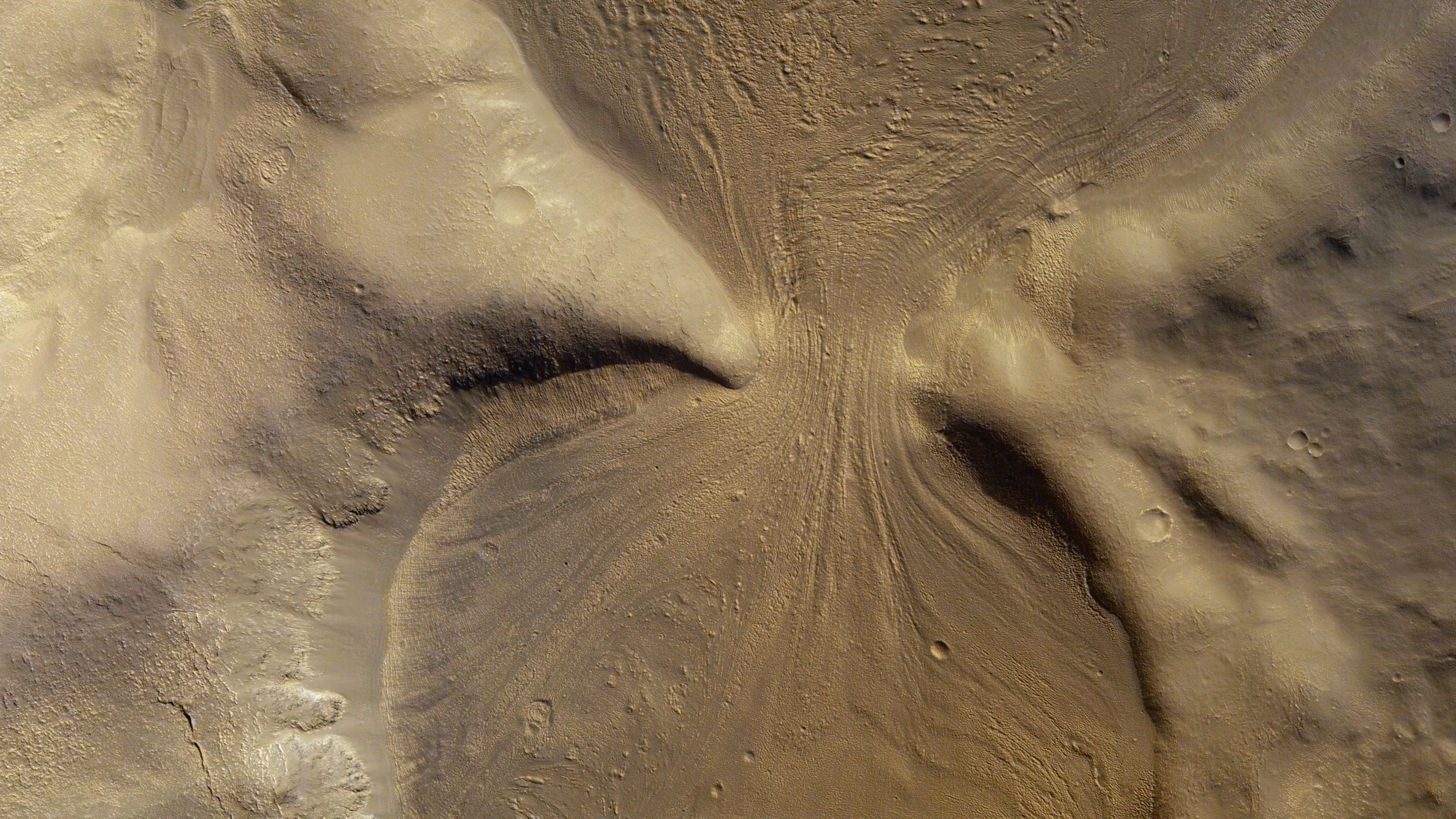
MRO image of a rock glacier in Hellas Montes (natural color)

Hellas Montes is a mountain range on the planet Mars. This group of mountains are located along the western rim of the giant Hellas Basin. It has a diameter of 153.00 km. This mountain range was approved in 1991.

To determine the history of major geologic events that shape the Hellas Montes range, research/analysis done in 2006 found tongue-shaped landform in the ranges. Morphologically derived evidence shows these landforms to have originated from volcanic edifice located in the North. Additional analysis suggests that this can also be possibly connected to landslide mechanisms.

== See also ==
- List of mountains on Mars
