= Sisyphi Montes =

Martian mountain range

- Location: Sisyphi Planum
- Coordinates: 69.65°S 13.08°E

Sisyphi Montes is a mountain range within the Sisyphi Planum on the planet Mars. The mountain range various degrees of degradation. It has a diameter of 200 kilometres (124 mi). The name Sisyphi Montes is a classical albedo name. This was approved by International Astronomical Union in 1985. The classical name comes from the myth of Sisyphus, in Greek mythology. Sisyphus, the king of Corinth, was punished in Hades by having to roll a huge stone up a hill only to have it roll down again as soon as he had brought it to the top. He had to do this over and over again. There are a number of mountains in this range, hence the plural form of Sisyphus is used for this group of mountains.

Sisyphi Montes are located in the Mare Australe quadrangle, between Argyre and Hellas impact basins.

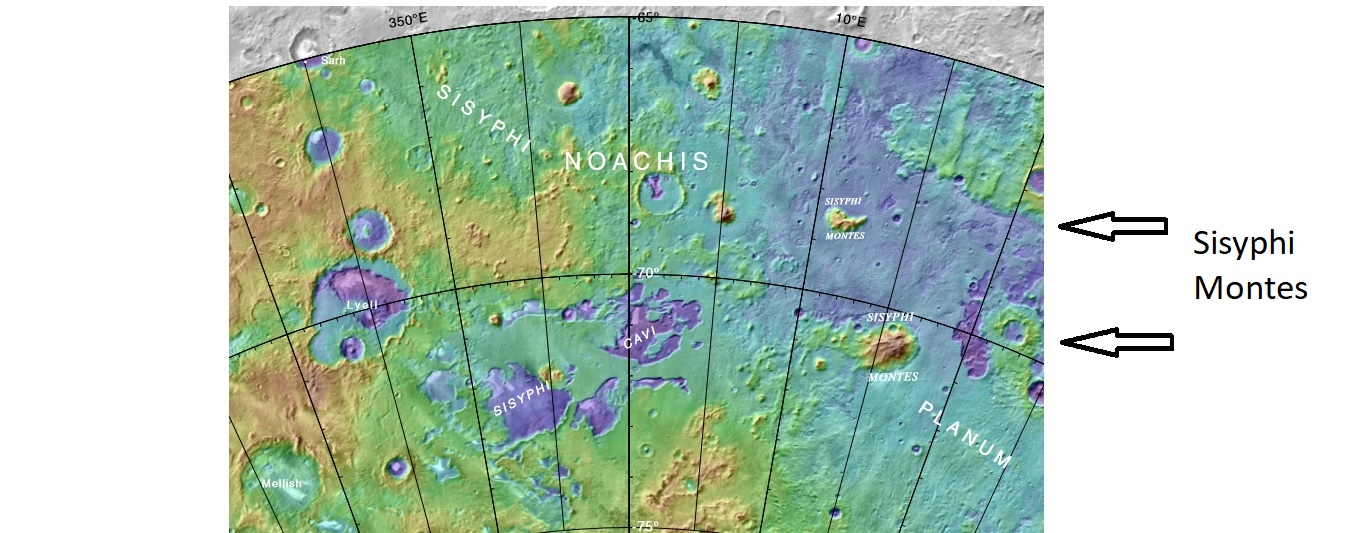
Map showing location of Sisyphi Montes and other nearby features

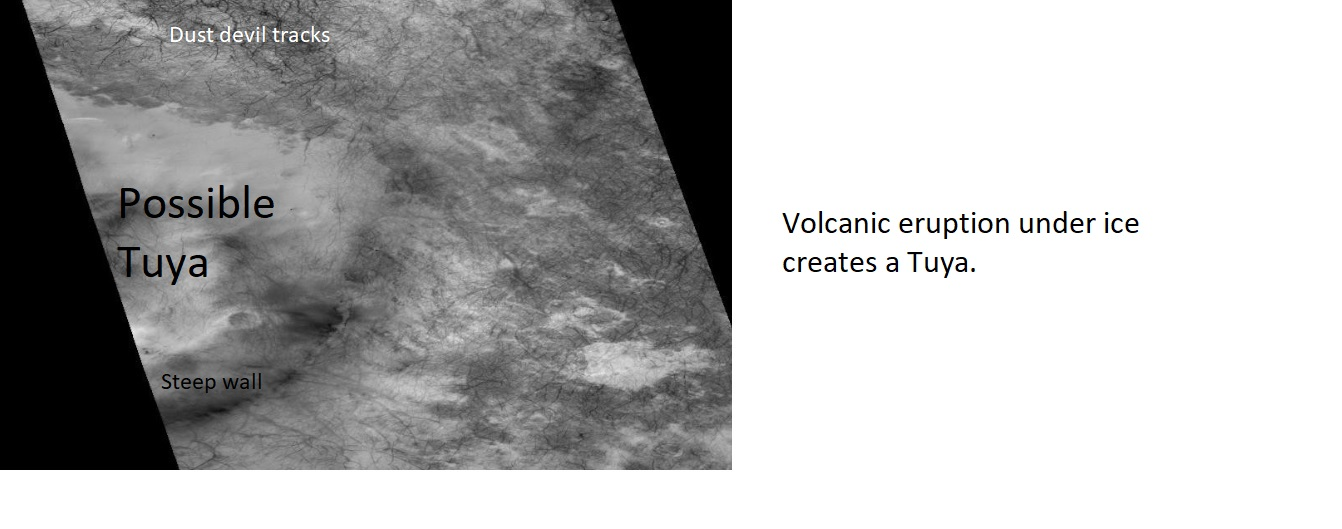
CTX image of possible Tuya--a volcano that erupted under ice

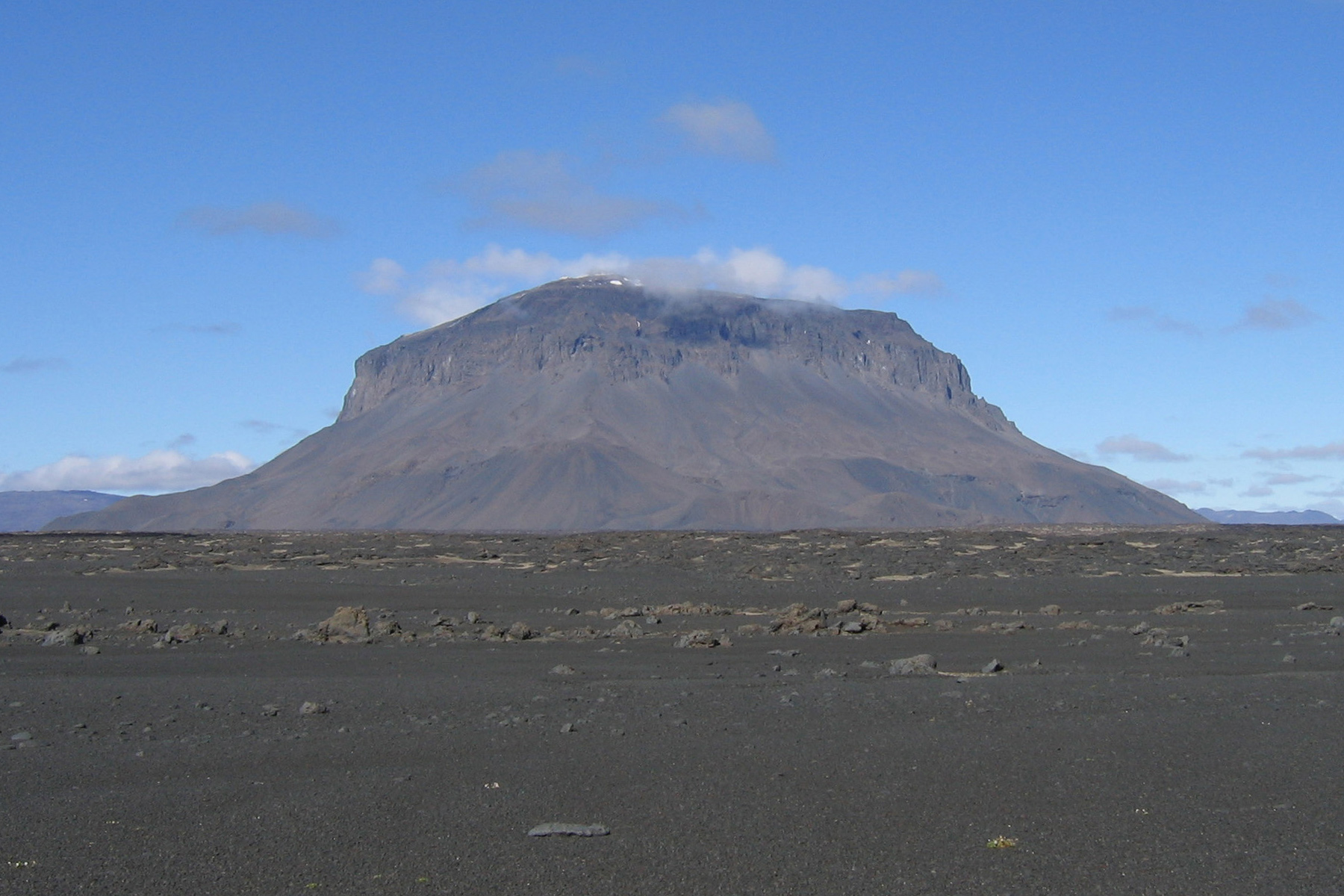
Herðubreið, a tuya in Iceland

== Ice Sheet ==
Some researchers have suggested that a large ice sheet covered much of the Mare Australe quadrangle. Sisyphi Montes consists of about 100 dome-like structures that resemble volcanoes that have erupted under ice sheets on the Earth. Similar shapes are present in Iceland. These domes are quite far from the present ice sheet (1,600 kilometers). The current cap is only about 350 kilometres across, so the ice cap in the past would have been way bigger and held much more water.

Measurements with the Compact Reconnaissance Imaging Spectrometer for Mars CRISM detected minerals that are formed when a volcano erupts under an ice sheet. Some of the minerals found are clays, sulfates, Iron oxides, and zeolites. This combination is often called palagonite.

When volcanoes erupt under an ice sheet large masses of warm water are created. Masses of warm water under Martian ice could provide suitable places for life to exist. Such environments are also good for preserving fossils.

== See also ==
- List of mountains on Mars
