= Hibes Montes =

Mountain on Mars

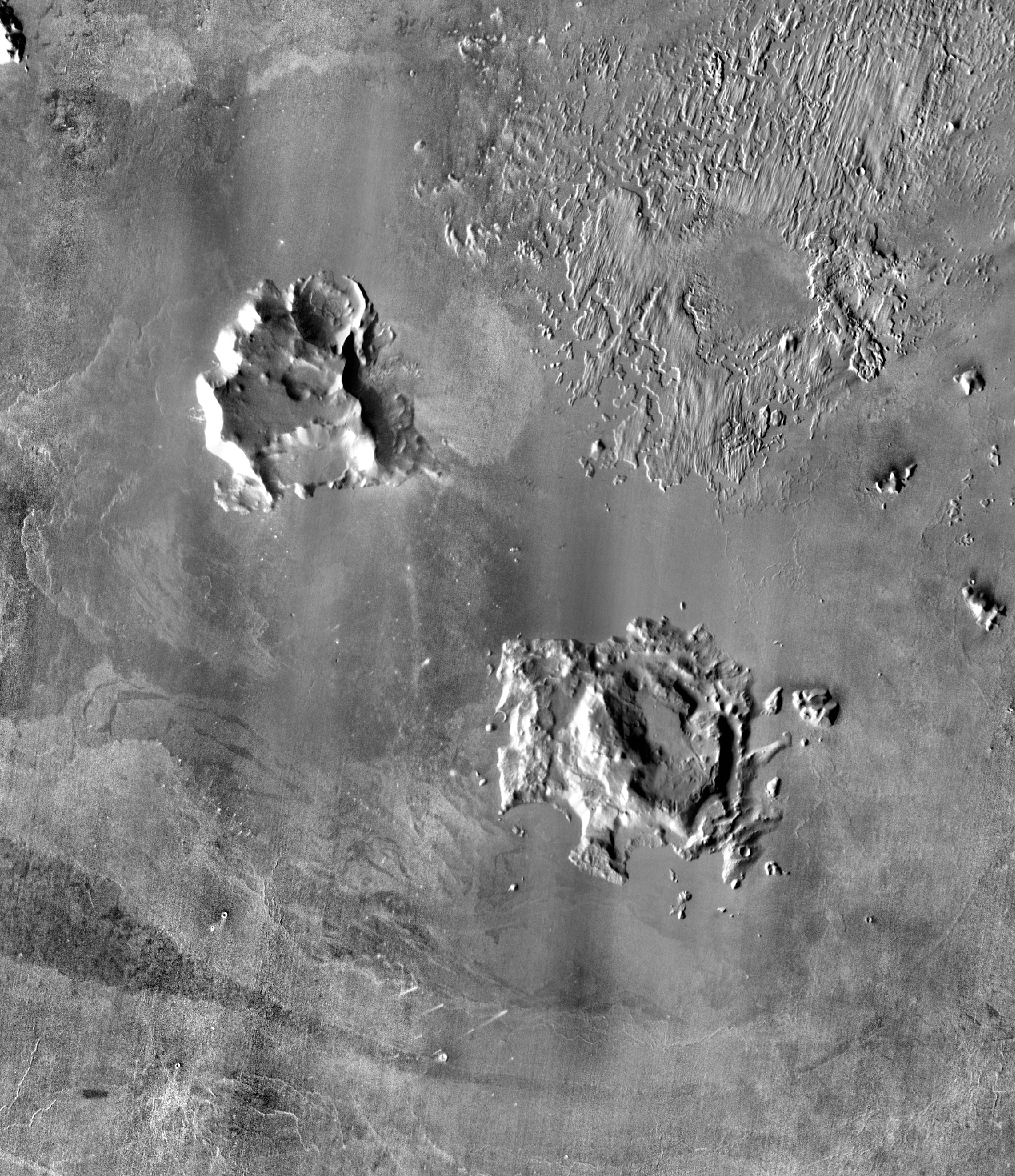
- Hibes Montes, as seen by THEMIS.
- Coordinates: 3.79°N 171.34°E

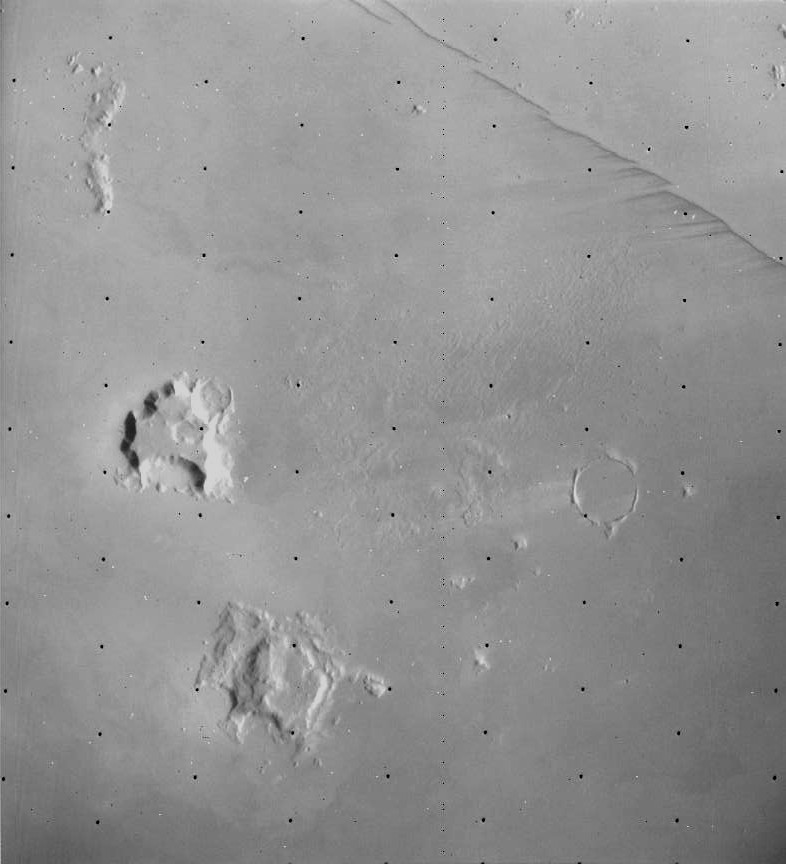
Viking Orbiter 1 image (1980)

Hibes Montes is a mountain range on the planet Mars, consisting of a northwestern and southeastern peak rising above Elysium Planitia. The name Hibes Montes is a classical albedo name. It has a diameter of 137 kilometres (85 mi). This was approved by International Astronomical Union in 1985.

== See also ==
- List of mountains on Mars
