= Pindus Mons =

Mountain on Mars

- Coordinates: 39.47°N 271.48°E
- Peak: 1,140 metres (3,740 ft)

Pindus Mons is a mountain on the planet Mars which is located in Tempe Terra. It has a diameter of 17 kilometres (11 mi) and an elevation of 1,140 metres (3,740 ft). The name was approved in 1991.

== See also ==
- List of mountains on Mars
