= Australe Montes =

Mountain on Mars

- Coordinates: 80.19°S 14.05°E
- Peak: 5,000 meter

Australe Montes is a mountain on the planet Mars. The name Australe Montes is a classical albedo name. It has a diameter of 387 kilometres (240 mi). This was approved by International Astronomical Union in 2003.

== See also ==
- List of mountains on Mars
