= Issedon Tholus =

Martian landform

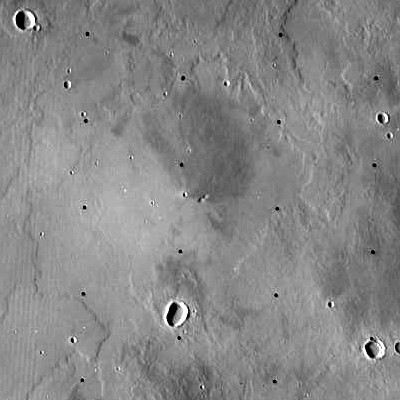
- Viking Orbiter 1 image
- Feature type: Tholus
- Coordinates: 36.05°N 265.17°E
- Naming: Classical albedo name

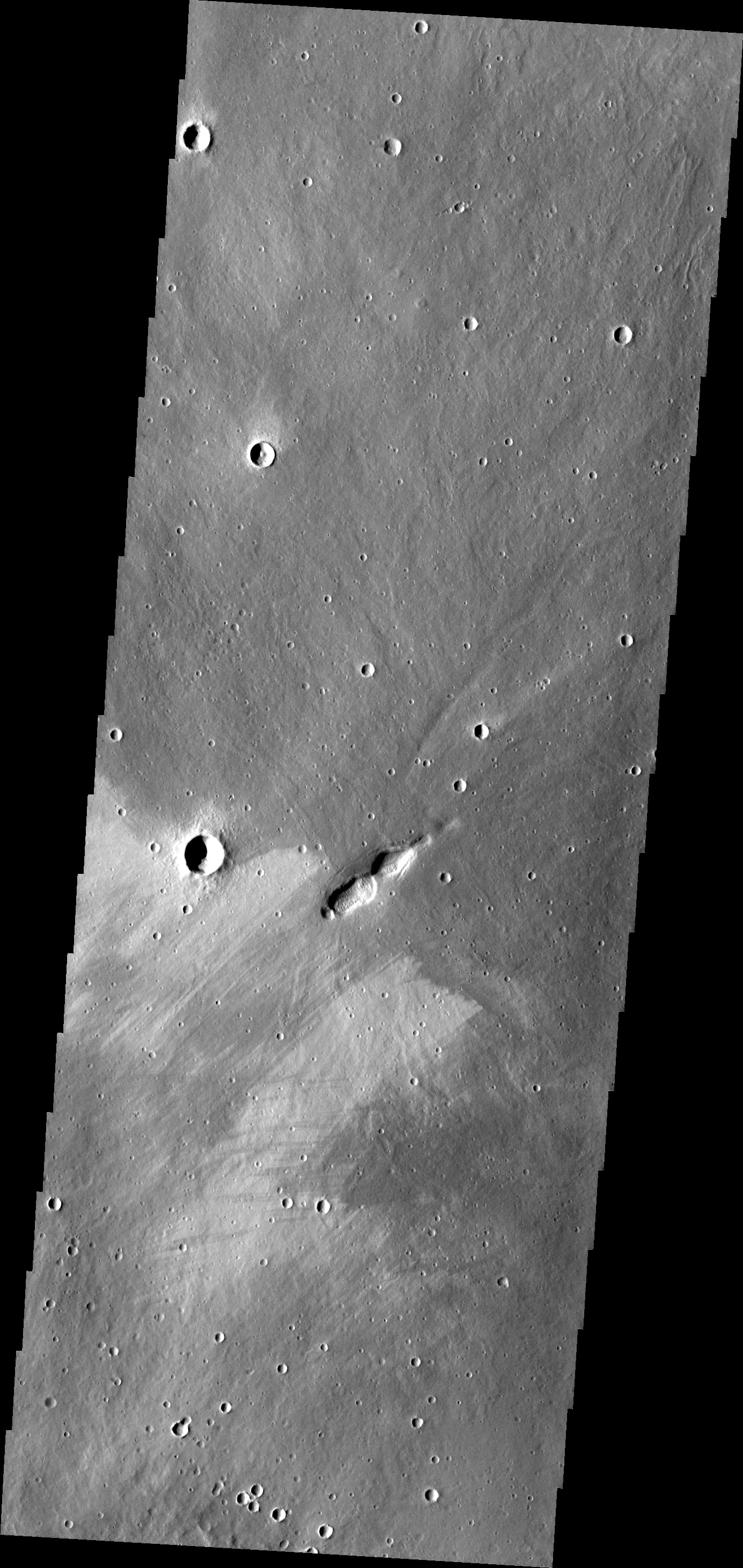
THEMIS image

Issedon Tholus is a volcanic feature located in the Arcadia quadrangle on the planet Mars, east of Alba Mons. It is approximately circular and 55 km in diameter. It has an irregular depression at its summit.

It was named in 1991 by the IAU.

The small crater Chatturat is to the south of Issedon Tholus. Far to the west is Alba Mons.
