= Hrad Vallis =

Vallis on Mars

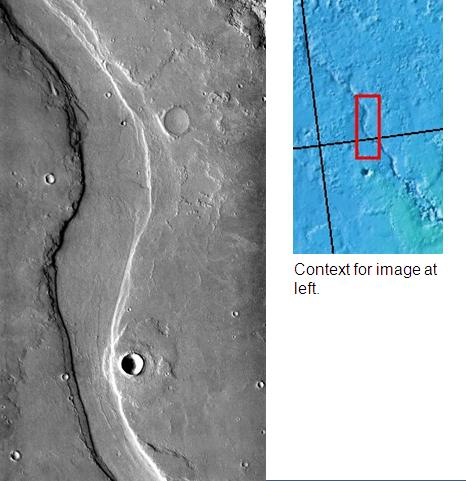
- Hrad Vallis may have been formed when the large Elysium Mons volcanic complex melted ground ice, as seen by THEMIS.
- Coordinates: 38.7°N 224.7°W

Hrad Vallis is an ancient outflow channel in the Cebrenia quadrangle of Mars, located at 38.7° north latitude and 224.7° west longitude. It is 825 km in length and was named for the word for "Mars" in Armenian.

== Volcano ice interactions ==
Large amounts of water ice are believed to be present under the surface of Mars. Some channels lie near volcanic areas. When hot subsurface molten rock comes close to this ice, large amounts of liquid water and mud may be formed. Hrad Vallis in the Cebrenia quadrangle is close to Elysium Mons, a large volcano, and may have supplied water to create the channel.

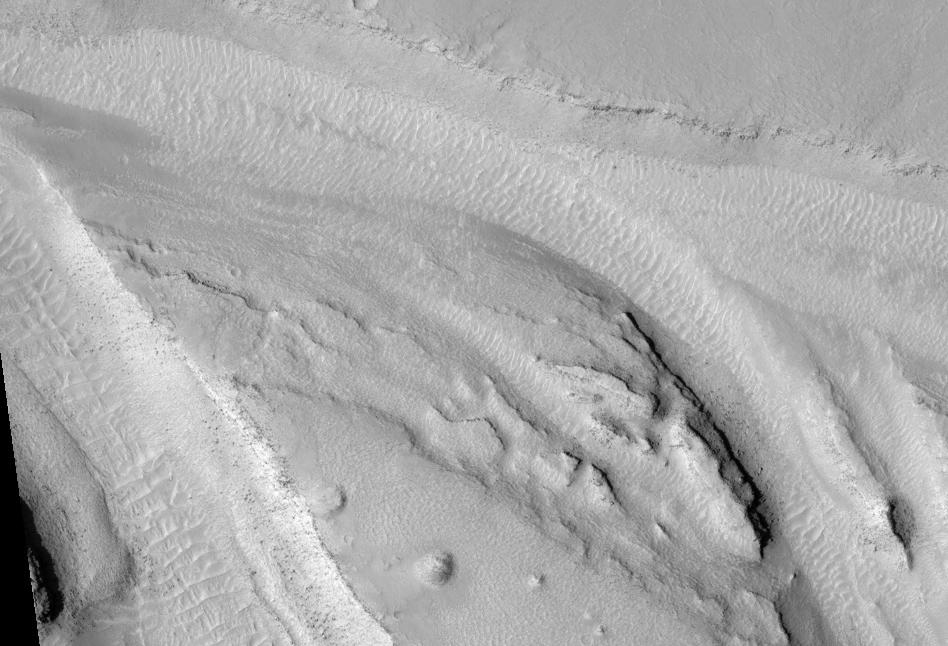
Streamlined islands in Hrad Vallis, as seen by HiRISE.

== See also ==
- Geography of Mars
- Geology of Mars
- HiRISE
- Lakes on Mars
- Outflow channels
- Vallis (planetary geology)
- Water on Mars
