= Echus Montes =

Martian geographical feature

- Echus Montes based on THEMIS day-time image.
- Coordinates: 7.81°N 282.05°E

Echus Montes is a large mountain on Mars at 7.81°N 282.05°E. It is located in the Lunae Palus quadrangle.

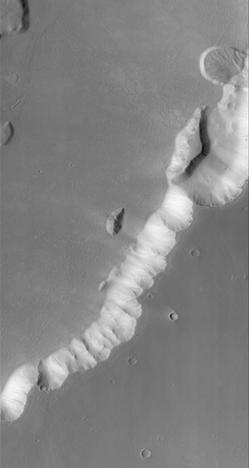
Echus Montes, as seen by CTX.
