= Galaxius Mons =

Group of mountains on Mars

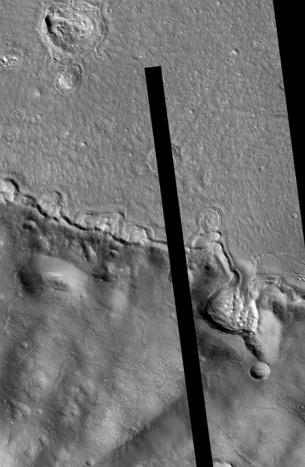
- Galaxius Mons, as seen by HiRISE. The black line was a section that was not imaged. There are many more details visible on the original image.
- Coordinates: 34.76°N 217.69°W
- Naming: a classical albedo name

Galaxius Mons is a group of mountains in the Cebrenia quadrangle of Mars, located at 34.76 North and 217.69 West. It is 22 km (13.7 miles) in diameter. The mountain range has a "classical albedo name". The term "Mons" is used for a mountain.

== See also ==
- Geography of Mars
- Geology of Mars
- HiRISE
- List of mountains on Mars by height
