= Geryon Montes =

Mountain range on the planet Mars

- Coordinates: 7.72°S 278.38°E

Geryon Montes is a mountain range on the planet Mars. The name Geryon Montes is a classical albedo name. It has a diameter of 359 kilometres (223 mi). This mountain range was approved by International Astronomical Union in 1991.

== See also ==
- List of mountains on Mars
