= Pityusa Patera =

Patera on Mars

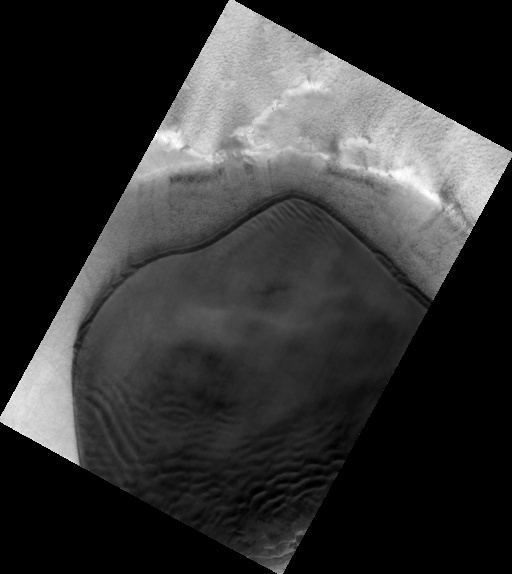
- Pityusa Patera, as seen by HiRISE.
- Coordinates: 66.88°S 36.86°E

Pityusa Patera is a feature in the Mare Australe quadrangle of Mars, located at 66.88° S and 36.86° E. It is 230.0 km across and was named after a classical albedo feature name.
