= Elysium (volcanic province) =

Second largest volcanic region of Mars

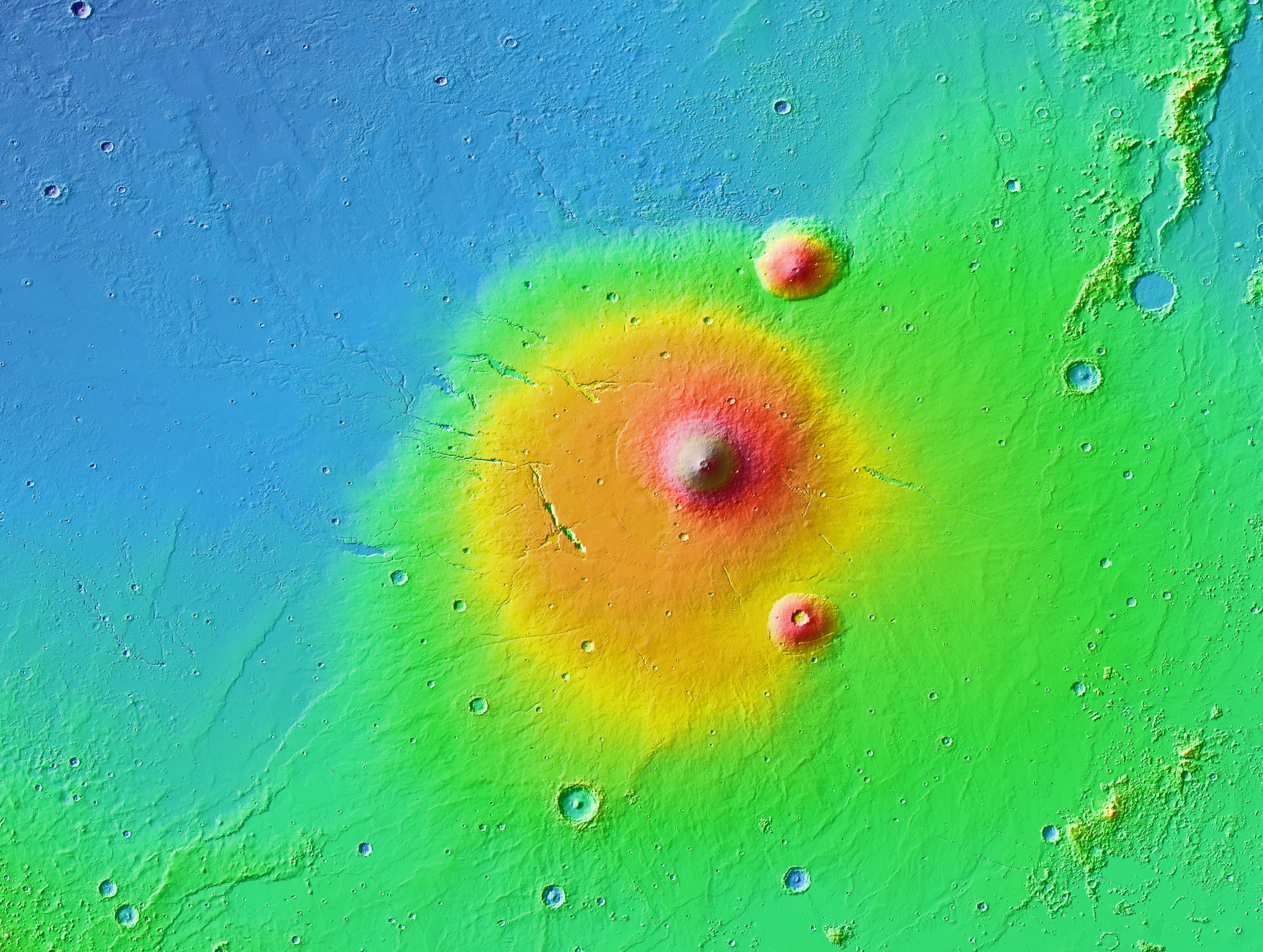
- Colorized topographic map of Elysium and its surroundings, from the MOLA instrument of Mars Global Surveyor. The shield volcano Elysium Mons is at center, with the smaller volcanoes Hecates Tholus and Albor Tholus to its upper and lower right, respectively.
- Coordinates: 24.7°N 150.0°E

Elysium, located in the Elysium and Cebrenia quadrangles, is the second largest volcanic region on Mars, after Tharsis. (Note: Officially, "Elysium" is an albedo feature.) The region includes the volcanoes (from north to south) Hecates Tholus, Elysium Mons and Albor Tholus. The province is centered roughly on Elysium Mons at 24.7°N 150°E. Elysium Planitia is a broad plain to the south of Elysium, centered at 3.0°N 154.7°E. Another large volcano, Apollinaris Mons, lies south of Elysium Planitia and is not part of the province. Besides having large volcanoes, Elysium has several areas with long trenches, called fossa or fossae (plural) on Mars. They include the Cerberus Fossae, Elysium Fossae, Galaxias Fossae, Hephaestus Fossae, Hyblaeus Fossae, Stygis Fossae and Zephyrus Fossae.

== Composition ==
The southeastern portion of the province is geochemically distinct from the northwest. The southeast is composed of sedimentary and porous rocks. The majority of the southeastern portion is made up of Amazonian-Hesperian volcanic units. Most of the remaining southeastern volcanic units are late Amazonian in nature. In recent history, there were significant groundwater deposits in the region.

It has been hard to study the composition of this province, due to the layer of dust that sits on top of the crust. Investigations in relatively dust-free regions indicate that it is made primarily of high-calcium pyroxene and olivine. To a lesser degree, the province is made up of hematite and hydrated silica, among other things. There are no strong magnetic fields in the region. There are some extant near-surface glacial deposits in the caldera of Hecates Tholus, a volcano in the province.

== Formation ==
The southeastern portion of the province is approximately 0.85 billion years younger than the northwestern. The region as a whole has been volcanically active for at least 3.9 billion years, with a peak 2.2 billion years ago, although activity has decreased considerably in the last billion years. Crater counting done on the lava flows in the southern region show low cratering rates, which would indicate younger volcanic activity, as recent as 10 Myr. The most recent volcanic activity dates to 2 million years ago. The southeastern portion overlaps with Cerberus Fossae; features in this region are thought to have formed due to volcanic and water-related processes, such as phreatomagmatism, relict ice flows, and interactions between lava and water. In general, many flow units in Elysium Planitia (such as Rahway Valles and Marte Vallis) are thought to have their origins in lava originating from this region.

Hecates Tholus erupted ~350 million years ago, with glacial deposits in the resulting caldera dating between 5 and 24 million years ago. Craters in the region are not generally typical of impacts; rather, they are thought to have formed due to explosive volcanism or collapse due to subsurface lava withdrawal.

Elysium contains numerous lava flow units with variable histories as well as volcanic and fluvial channels. The three major volcanoes of the region sit on top of a 1700 x 2400 km broad dome. The summit of Hecates Tholus shows evidence of pyroclastic activity. Martian volcanism has been dominated by effusive eruption styles and there is limited evidence to support widespread explosive or pyroclastic volcanic eruptions on Mars.

Elysium Mons is approximately 1.5 times as steep as any other Martian volcano at approximately 7-7.5°. The caldera at the summit of Elysium Mons is approximately 13.5 km in diameter. Extending past the rim of this central caldera are at least 18 sinuous channels thought to be the remnants of collapsed lava tubes and lava channels.

== Observation history ==
The Elysium volcanic province was first noticed as a distinct Martian region as a result of data obtained from the Mariner 9 mission, in the 1970s. The Viking orbiter noted that volcanic province of Elysium experienced more diverse types of volcanism than the Tharsis volcanic region. In 2004, ESA's Mars Express orbiter's HRSC observed the volcanoes in the region. The InSight Lander landed just south of the province in 2018, in Elysium Planitia, and has detected marsquakes emanating from this region. The main science goals of the lander are to monitor the level of seismic activity occurring on Mars and to understand how Mars formed and how the planet has been evolving ever since.

== Volcanoes of Elysium ==
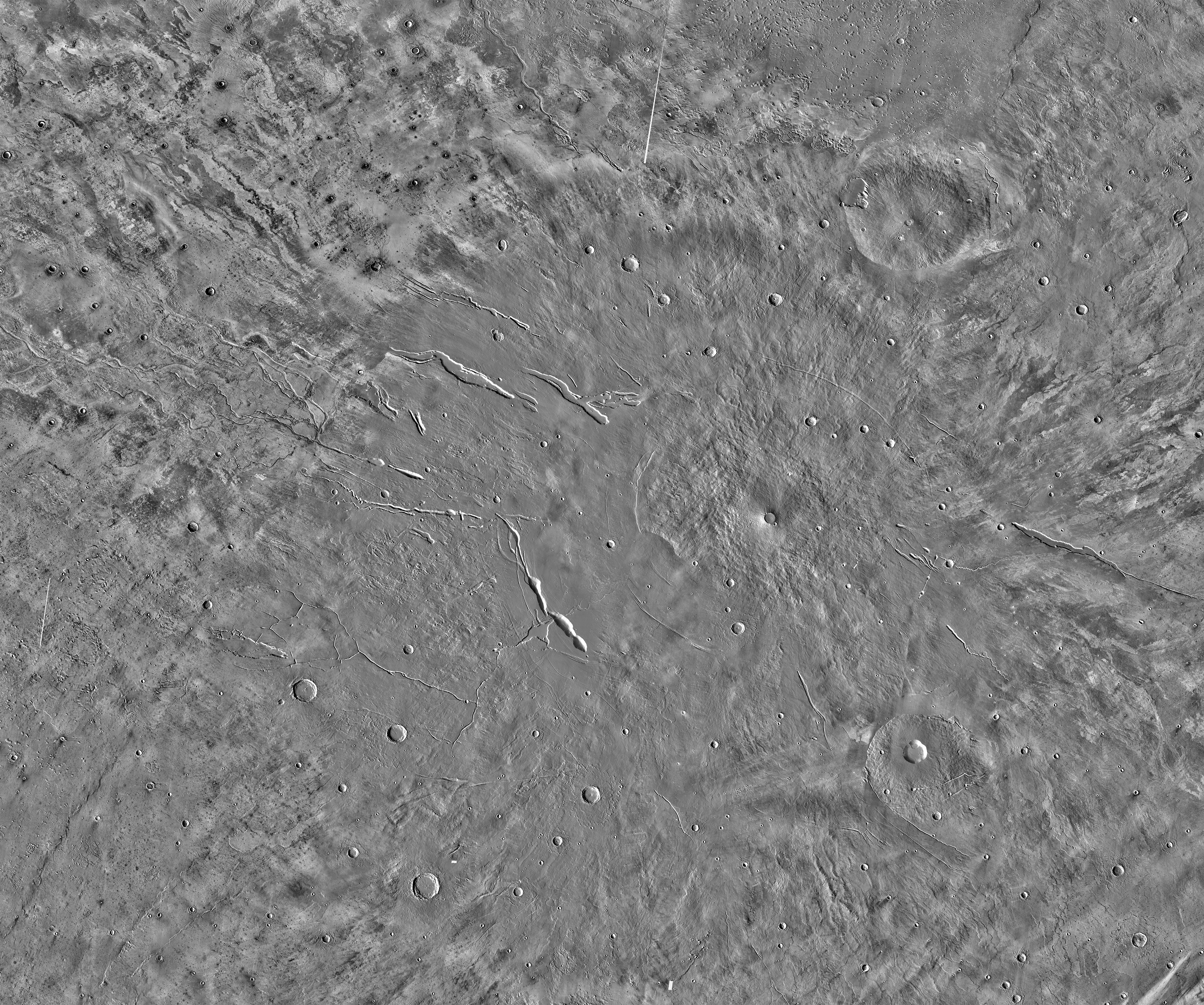
High-resolution THEMIS daytime infrared image mosaic of Elysium from 2001 Mars Odyssey.

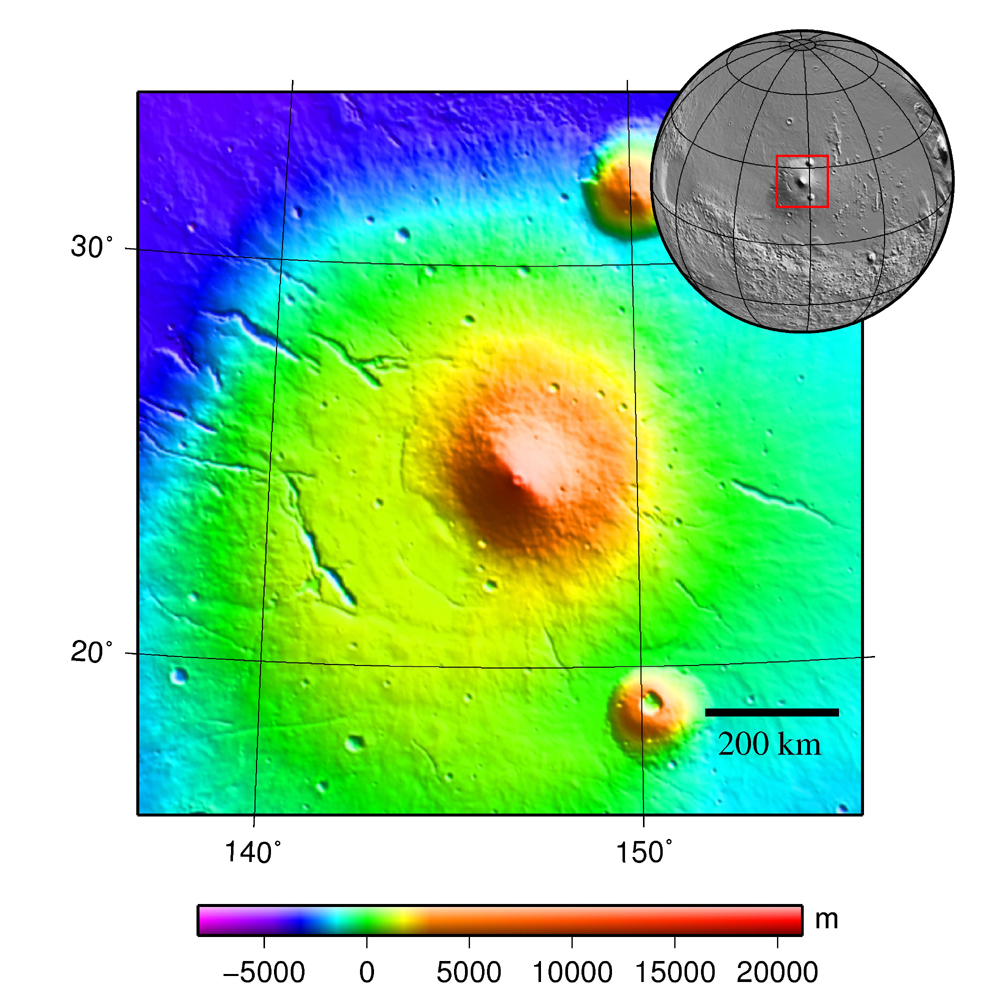
MOLA maps showing the geographic context of Elysium.

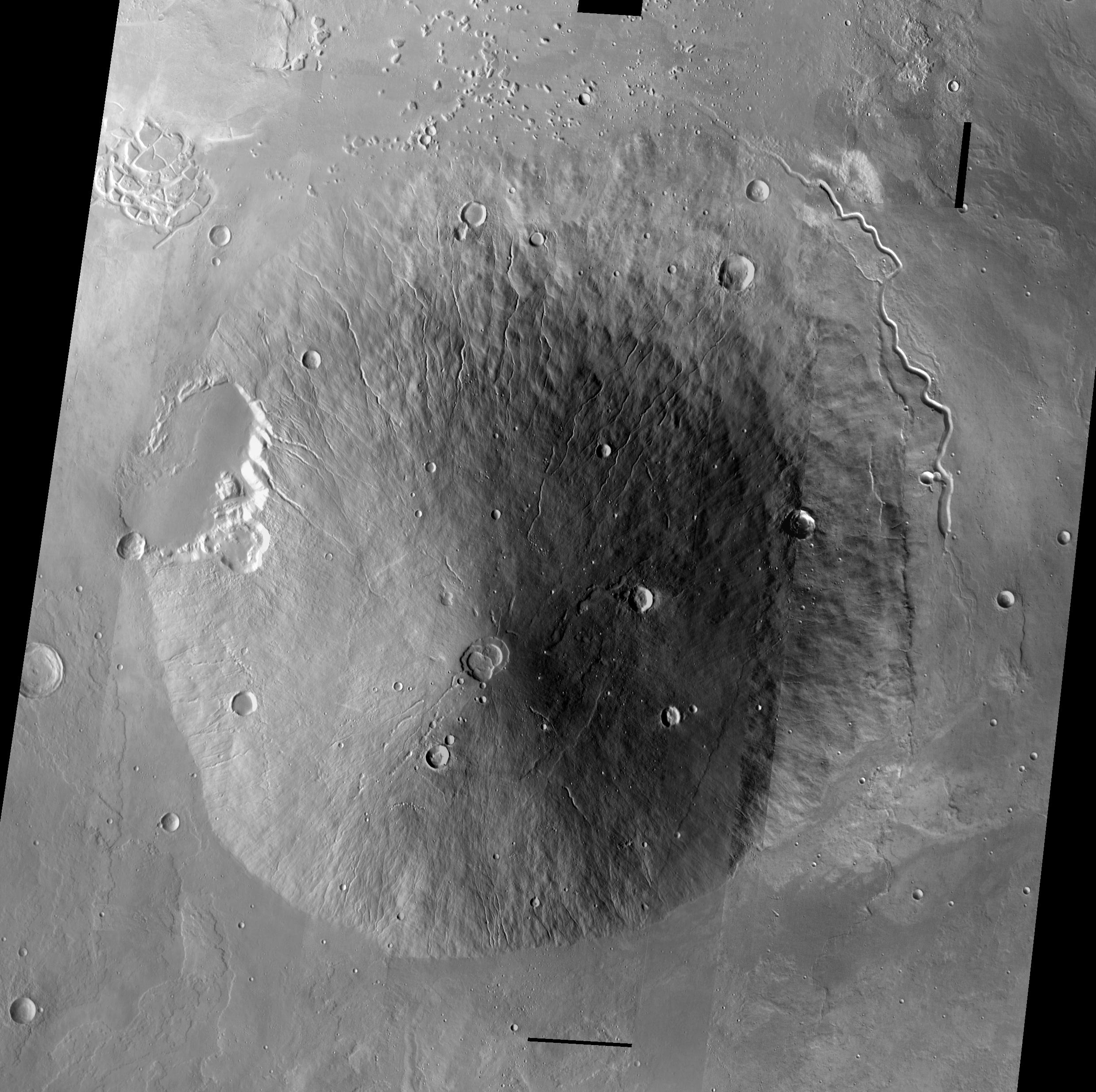
Hecates Tholus, as seen by THEMIS.

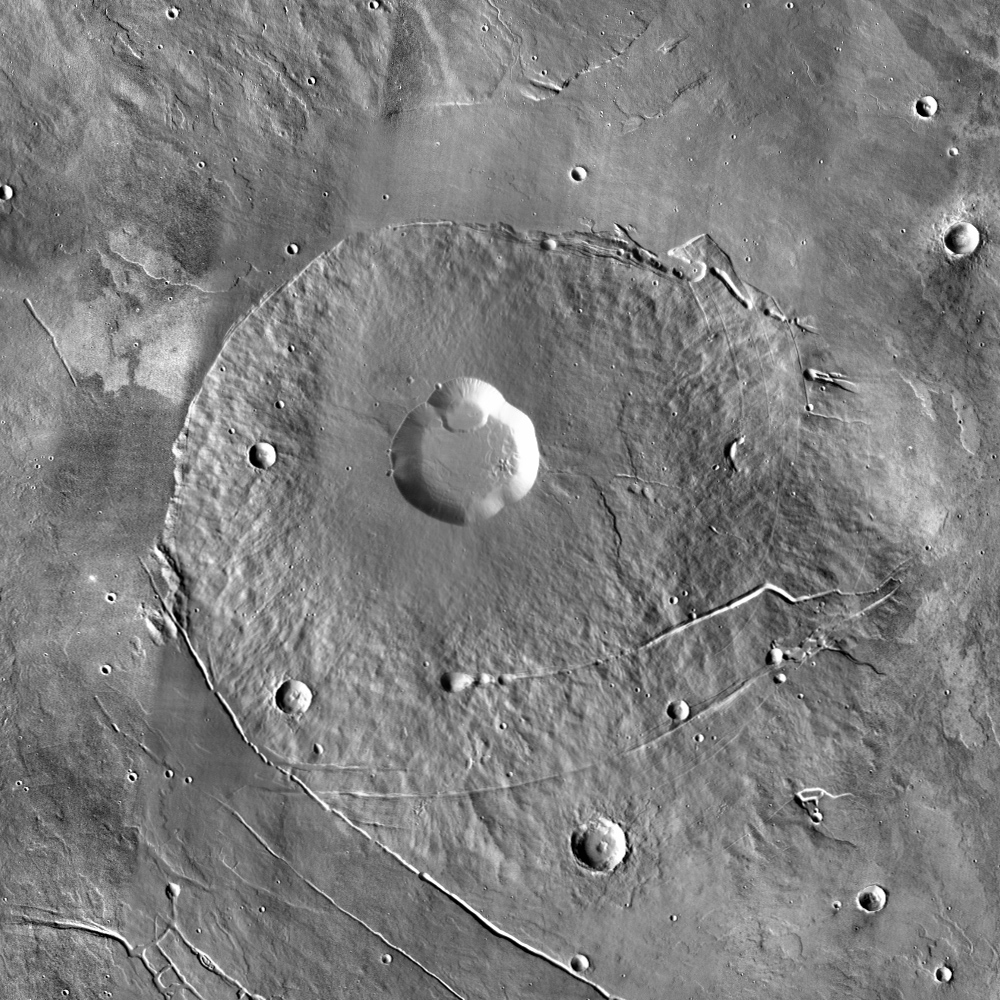
Albor Tholus, as seen by THEMIS.

== Troughs (fossae) in Elysium ==
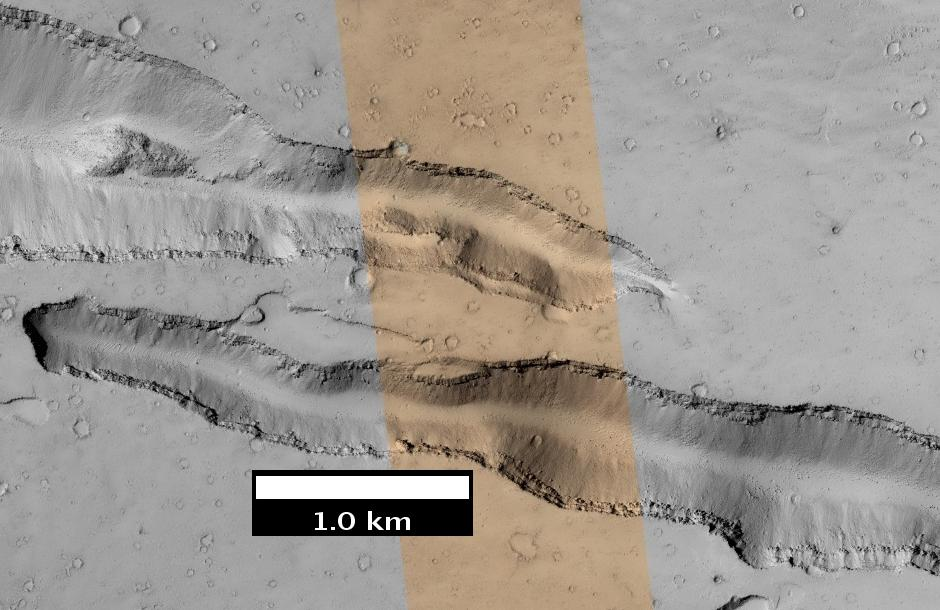
Troughs to the east of Albor Tholus, as seen by HiRISE under the HiWish program

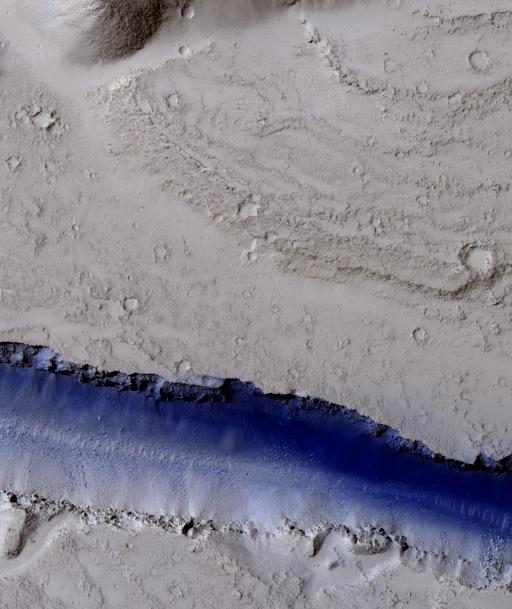
Portion of a trough (fossa) in Elysium, as seen by HiRISE under the HiWish program (blue indicates probably seasonal frost)

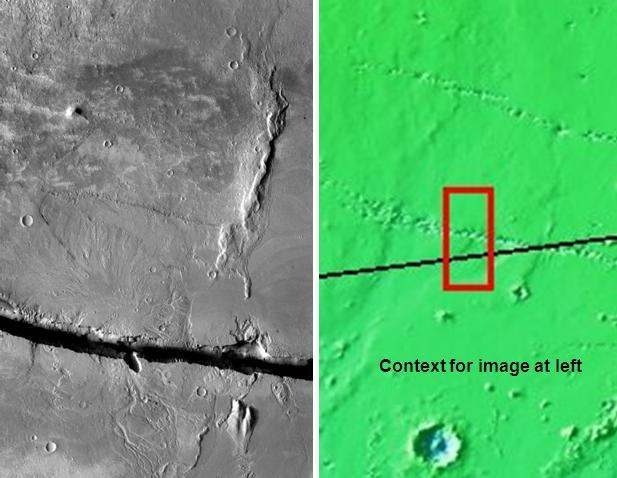
A Cerberus Fossae trough, as seen from THEMIS

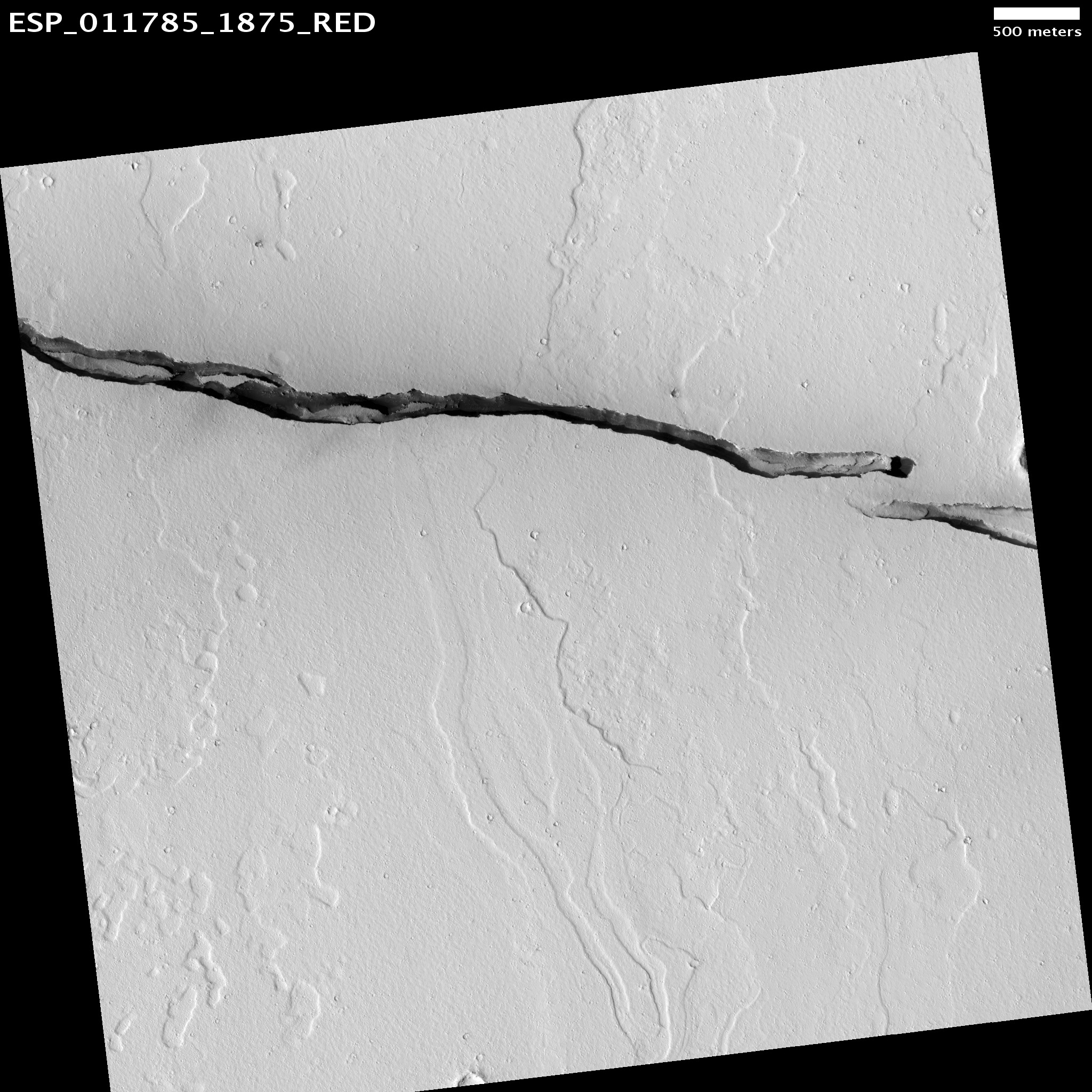
Wind-blown material darkens areas around a Cerberus Fossae trough (scale bar for HiRISE image is 500 m)

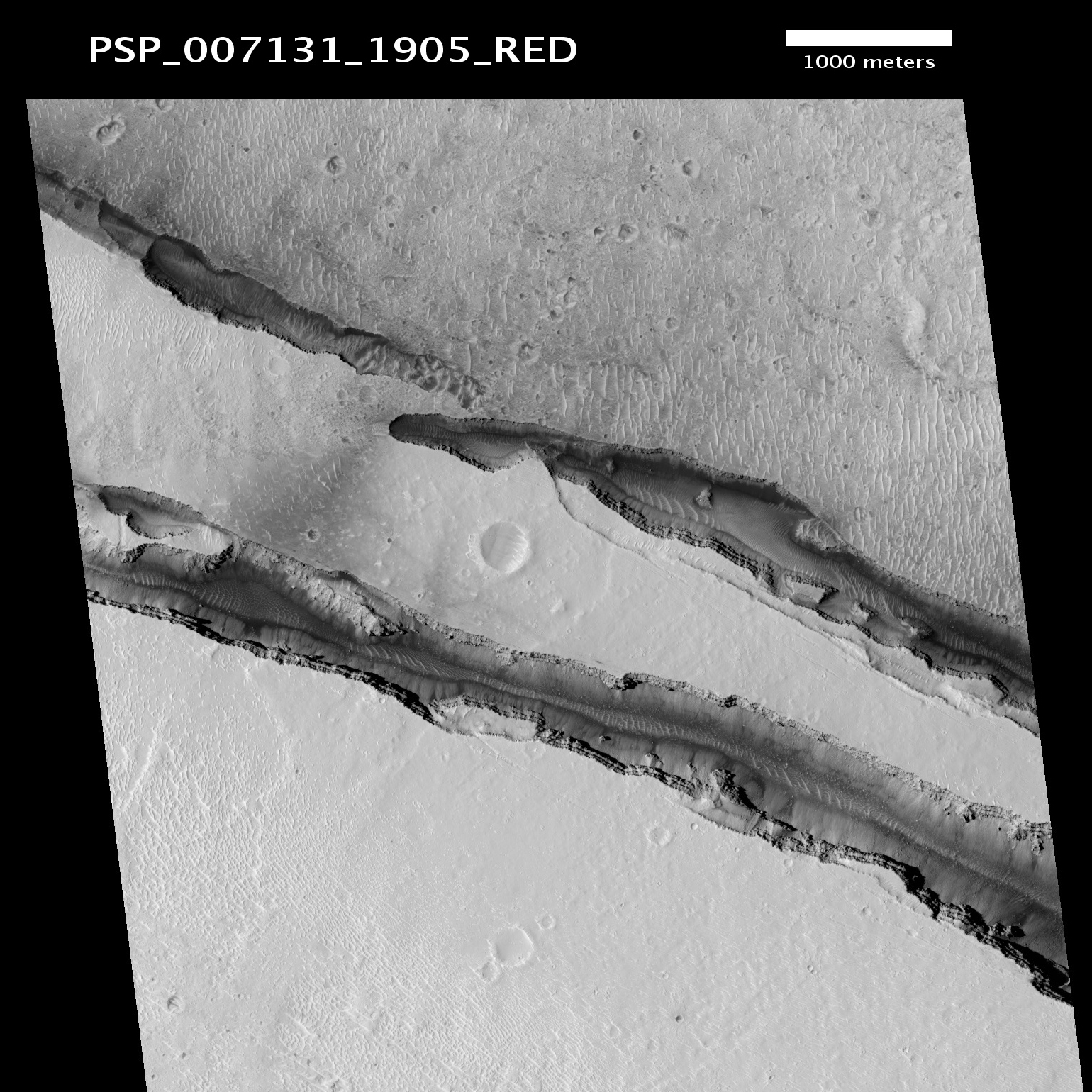
The Cerberus Fossae, as seen by HiRISE (scale bar is 1.0 km)

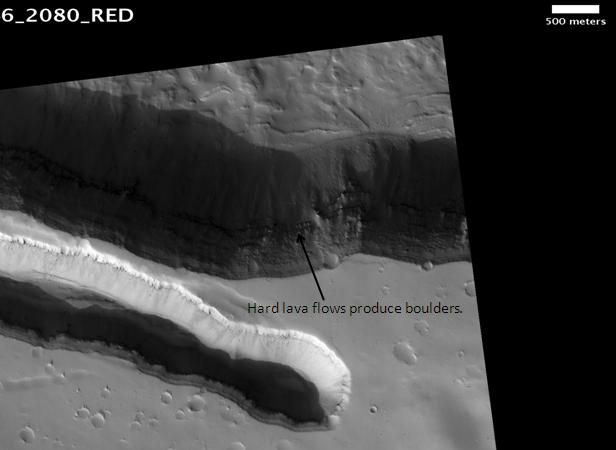
The Elysium Fossae, as seen by HiRISE (click on image to see layers)

Two views of the Hephaestus Fossae, as seen by HiRISE (picture on right lies to the top (north) of other picture). Fossae often form by material moving into an underground void.

== See also ==
- Fossa (geology)
- Geography of Mars
- Geology of Mars
- List of quadrangles on Mars
- Volcanism on Mars
