= Rahway Valles =

Valles on Mars

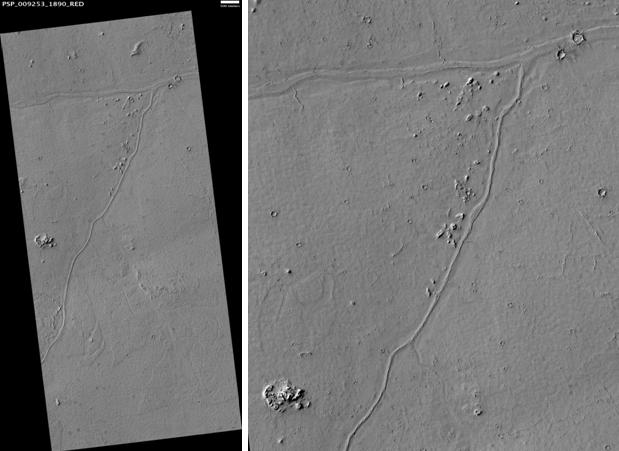
- The Rahway Valles, as seen by HiRISE (scale bar is 500 m)
- Coordinates: 9.4°N 186.2°W
- Naming: A river in New Jersey, USA

The Rahway Valles are a set of channels in a valley in the Elysium quadrangle of Mars, located at 9.4° North and 186.2° West. They are 500 kilometres (310 mi) long and were named after an American river in New Jersey. The region was created by 'a'ā and pāhoehoe lava flows from the nearby Elysium volcanic province.
