= Cerberus (Mars) =

Crater on Mars

Cerberus is dark area to left of center

Cerberus is a large "dark spot" (an albedo feature) located on Mars and named after the mythical dog Cerberus. The arcuate (curved) markings in the upper right are in the Amazonis plains and may be sand drifts. The volcano Elysium Mons, a yellow area north of Cerberus, has several channels radiating from its flanks. The three bright spots, upper left, are volcanoes partially veiled by thin clouds.

== Description ==
High resolution images show the bulk of the Cerberus plains is covered by platy-ridged and inflated lavas, which are interpreted as insulated sheet flows. Eastern Cerberus plains lavas originate at Cerberus Fossae fissures and shields. Some flows extend for 2000 km through Marte Vallis into Amazonis Planitia. The Athabasca Valles are both incised into pristine lavas and embayed by pristine lavas, indicating that Athabascan fluvial events were contemporaneous with volcanic eruptions. Deposits of the Medusae Fossae Formation lie both over and under lavas, suggesting the deposition of this formation was contemporaneous with volcanism. Statistics of small craters indicate lavas in the western Cerberus plains may be less than a million years old, but the model isochrons may be unreliable if the small crater population is dominated by secondary craters (craters formed by material ejected from larger impacts). Images showing no large craters with diameters larger than 500 meters superimposed on western Cerberus plains lavas indicate the same surface is younger than 49 Ma (million years).

== See also ==
- Geography of Mars

== Sources ==
- "Cerberus". pds.jpl.nasa.gov.
- Lanagan P. D. (2004). Geological history of the Cerberus Plains, Mars (Ph.D dissertation). Bibcode:2004PhDT........16L.
- "Cerberus". Gazetteer of Planetary Nomenclature. USGS Astrogeology Research Program.
