= Elysium quadrangle =

One of 30 quadrangle maps of Mars used by the US Geological Survey

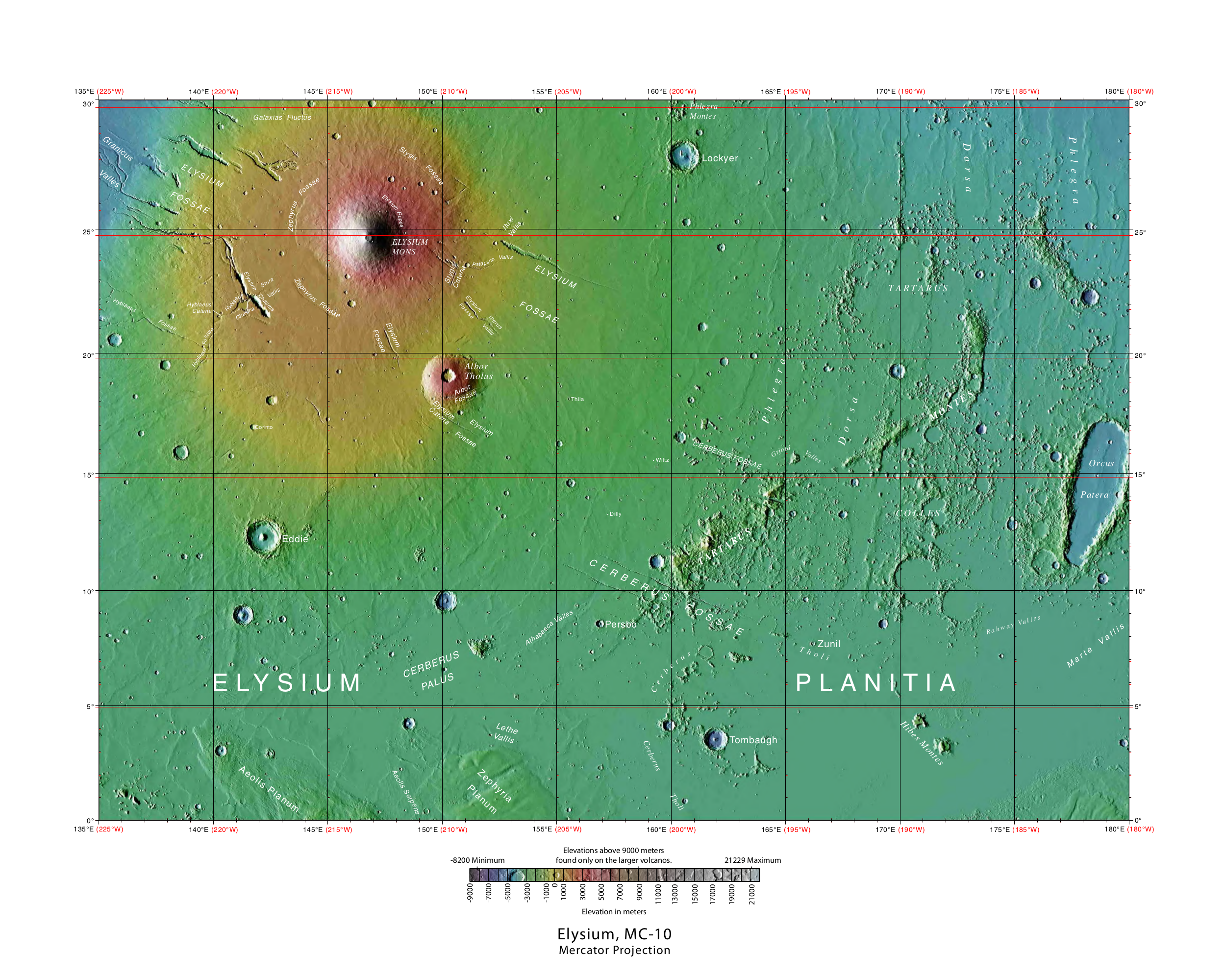
- Map of Elysium quadrangle from Mars Orbiter Laser Altimeter (MOLA) data. The highest elevations are red and the lowest are blue.
- Coordinates: 15°N 202.5°W

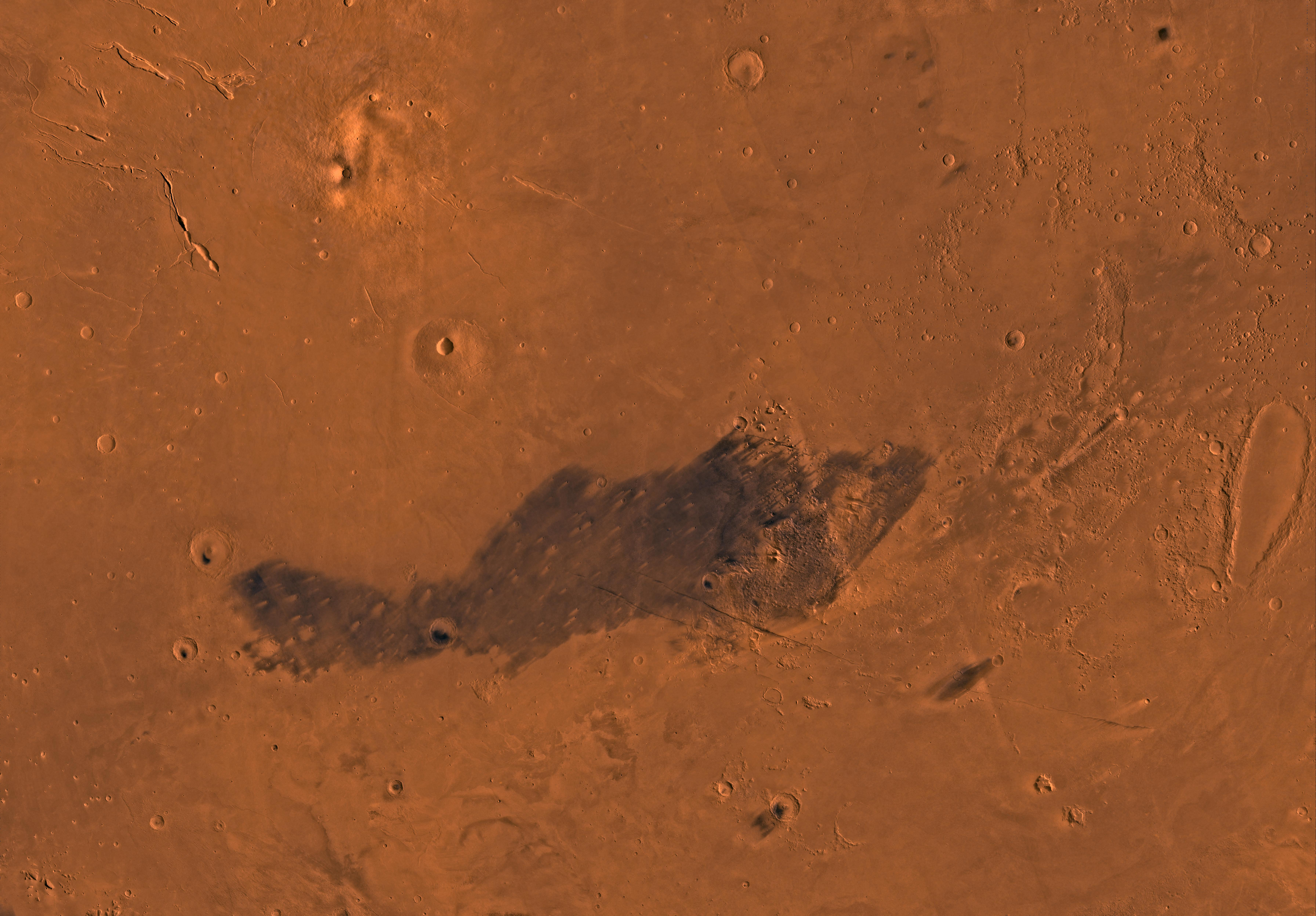
Image of the Elysium Quadrangle (MC-15). The north includes relatively smooth lowland plains. Elysium Mons and Albor Tholus are in the northwest and Orcus Patera is in the east.

The Elysium quadrangle is one of a series of 30 quadrangle maps of Mars used by the United States Geological Survey (USGS) Astrogeology Research Program. The Elysium quadrangle is also referred to as MC-15 (Mars Chart-15).

The name Elysium refers to a place of reward (Heaven), according to Homer in the Odyssey.

The Elysium quadrangle covers the area between 180° to 225° west longitude and 0° to 30° north latitude on Mars. The northern part of Elysium Planitia, a broad plain, is in this quadrangle. The Elysium quadrangle includes a part of Lucus Planum. A small part of the Medusae Fossae Formation lies in this quadrangle. The largest craters in this quadrangle are Eddie, Lockyer, and Tombaugh. The quadrangle contains the major volcanoes Elysium Mons and Albor Tholus, part of a volcanic province of the same name, as well as river valleys—one of which, Athabasca Valles may be one of the youngest on Mars. On the east side is an elongated depression called Orcus Patera. A large lake may once have existed in the south near Lethe Vallis and Athabasca Valles.

The InSight lander touched down in the southern part of this quadrangle in 2018 to conduct geophysical studies.

== Volcanoes ==
The Elysium quadrangle contains the volcanoes Elysium Mons and Albor Tholus.

David Susko and his colleagues at Louisiana State University analyzed geochemical and surface morphology data from Elysium using instruments on board NASA's Mars Odyssey Orbiter (2001) and Mars Reconnaissance Orbiter (2006). Through crater counting, they found differences in age between the northwest and the southeast regions of Elysium—about 850 million years of difference. They also found that the younger southeast regions are geochemically different from the older regions, and that these differences related to igneous processes, not secondary processes like the interaction of water or ice with the surface of Elysium in the past. "We determined that while there might have been water in this area in the past, the geochemical properties in the top meter throughout this volcanic province are indicative of igneous processes," Susko said. "We think levels of thorium and potassium here were depleted over time because of volcanic eruptions over billions of years. The radioactive elements were the first to go in the early eruptions. We are seeing changes in the mantle chemistry over time." "Long-lived volcanic systems with changing magma compositions are common on Earth, but an emerging story on Mars," said James Wray, study co-author and associate professor in the School of Earth and Atmospheric Sciences at Georgia Tech. Overall, these findings indicate that Mars is a much more geologically complex body than originally thought, perhaps due to various loading effects on the mantle caused by the weight of giant volcanoes. For decades, we saw Mars, as a lifeless rock, full of craters with a number of long inactive volcanoes. We had a very simple view of the red planet. Finding a variety of igneous rocks demonstrates that Mars has the potential for useful resource utilization and a capacity to sustain a human population on Mars. "It's much easier to survive on a complex planetary body bearing the mineral products of complex geology than on a simpler body like the moon or asteroids."

Much of the area near the volcanoes is covered with lava flows, some can even be shown approaching, then stopping upon reaching higher ground. (See pictures below for examples) Sometimes when lava flows the top cools quickly into a solid crust. However, the lava below often still flows, this action breaks up the top layer making it very rough. Such rough flow is called aa.

Research, published in January 2010, described the discovery of a vast single lava flow, the size of the state of Oregon, that "was put in place turbulently over the span of several weeks at most." This flow, near Athabasca Valles, is the youngest lava flow on Mars. It is thought to be of Late Amazonian Age. Other researchers disagree with this idea. Under Martian conditions lava should not stay fluid very long.

Some areas in the Elysium quadrangle are geological young and have surfaces that are hard to explain. Some have called them Platy-Ridged-Polygonized terrain. The surface has been suggested to be from pack ice, basalt lava, or a muddy flow. Using HiRISE images the heights of the ridges of the surface were measured. Most were less than 2 meters. This is far smaller than what is expected from lava flows. The high resolution photos demonstrated that the material seemed to flow which would not occur with pack ice. So, the researchers concluded that muddy flows cover the surface.

== Rootless cones ==
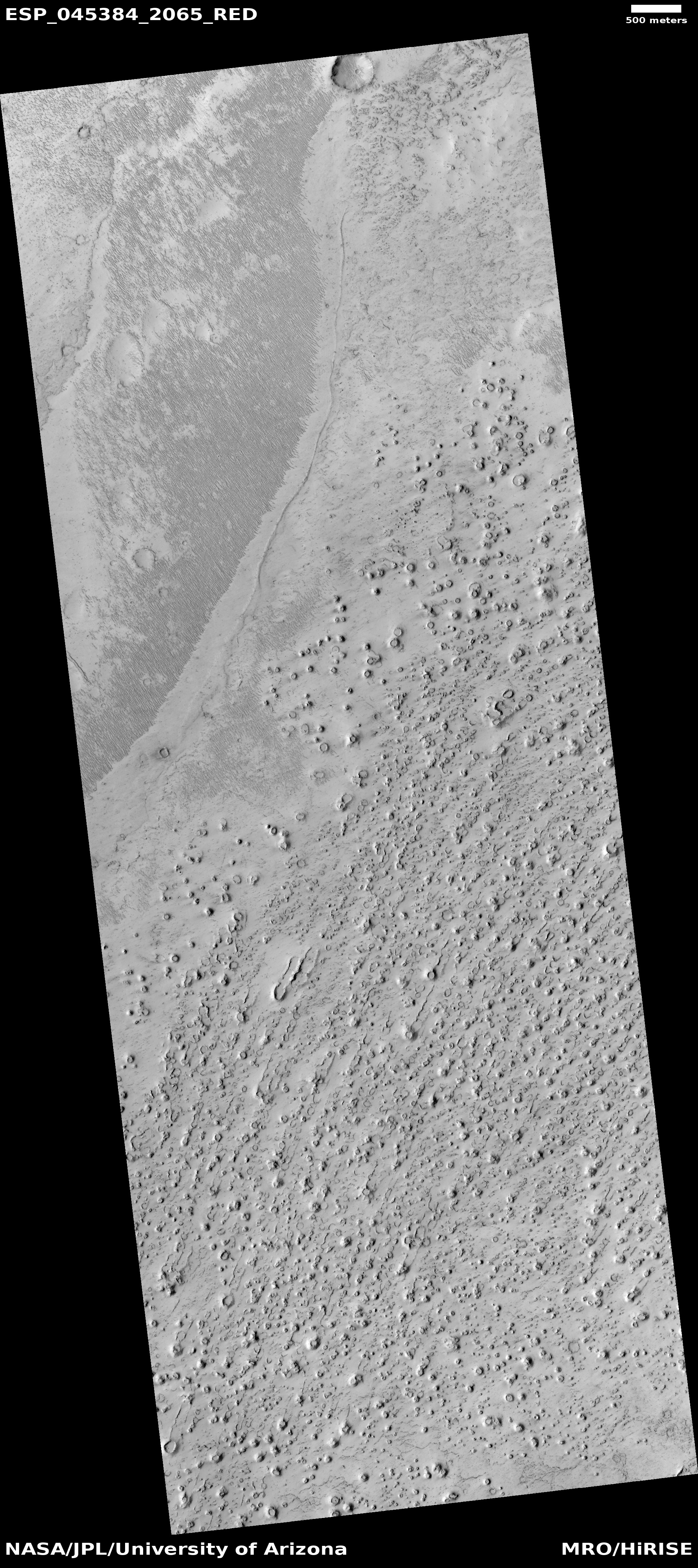
Wide view of field of rootless cones in Phlegra region, as seen by HiRISE under HiWish program

So-called "rootless cones" are caused by explosions of lava with ground ice under the flow. The ice melts and turns into a vapor that expands in an explosion that produces a cone or ring. Features like these are found in Iceland, when lavas cover water-saturated substrates.

== Layers ==
The Elysium Fossae contain layers, also called strata. Many places on Mars show rocks arranged in layers. Sometimes the layers are of different colors. Light-toned rocks on Mars have been associated with hydrated minerals like sulfates. The Mars rover Opportunity examined such layers close-up with several instruments. Pictures taken from orbiting spacecraft show that some layers of rocks seem to break up into fine dust; consequently these rocks are probably composed of small particles. Other layers break up into large boulders, so they are probably much harder. Basalt, a volcanic rock, is thought comprise the layers that form boulders. Basalt has been identified on Mars in many places. Instruments on orbiting spacecraft have detected clay (also called phyllosilicates) in some layers. Scientists are excited about finding hydrated minerals such as sulfates and clays on Mars because they are usually formed in the presence of water. Places that contain clays and/or other hydrated minerals would be good places to look for evidence of life.

Rock can be formed into layers in a variety of ways. Volcanoes, wind, or water can produce layers. Layers can be hardened by the action of groundwater. Martian ground water probably moved hundreds of kilometers, and in the process it dissolved many minerals from the rock it passed through. When ground water surfaces in low areas containing sediments, water evaporates in the thin atmosphere and leaves behind minerals as deposits and/or cementing agents. Consequently, layers of dust could not later easily erode away since they were cemented together.

== Fossae/pit craters ==
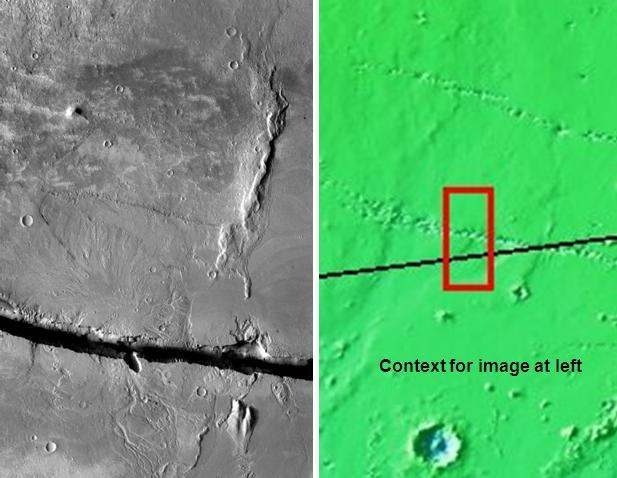
A trough in the Cerberus Fossae, as seen from THEMIS

The Elysium quadrangle is home to large troughs (long narrow depressions) called fossae in the geographical language used for Mars. Troughs are created when the crust is stretched until it breaks. The stretching can be due to the large weight of a nearby volcano. Fossae/pit craters are common near volcanoes in the Tharsis and Elysium system of volcanoes. A trough often has two breaks with a middle section moving down, leaving steep cliffs along the sides; such a trough is called a graben. Lake George, in northern New York State, is a lake that sits in a graben. Pits are produced when material collapses into the void that results from the stretching. Pit craters do not have rims or ejecta around them, like impact craters do. Studies have found that on Mars a fault may be as deep as 5 km (3.1 mi); that is, the break in the rock goes down to 5 km. Moreover, the crack or fault sometimes widens or dilates. This widening causes a void to form with a relatively high volume. When material slides into the void, a pit crater or a pit crater chain forms. On Mars, individual pit craters can join to form chains or even to form troughs that are sometimes scalloped. Other ideas have been suggested for the formation of fossae and pit craters. There is evidence that they are associated with dikes of magma. Magma might move along, under the surface, breaking the rock, and more importantly melting ice. The resulting action would cause a crack to form at the surface. Pit craters are not common on Earth. Sinkholes, where the ground falls into a hole (sometimes in the middle of a town) resemble pit craters on Mars. However, on the Earth these holes are caused by subsurface limestone being dissolved, thereby causing a void. The images below of the Cerberus Fossae, the Elysium Fossae and other troughs, as seen by HiRISE are examples of fossae.

Knowledge of the locations and formation mechanisms of pit craters and fossae is important for the future colonization of Mars because they may be reservoirs of water.

== Methane ==
Methane has been detected in three areas on Mars, one of which is in the Elysium quadrangle. This is exciting because one possible source of methane is from the metabolism of living bacteria. However, a recent study indicates that to match the observations of methane, there must be something that quickly destroys the gas, otherwise it would be spread all through the atmosphere instead of being concentrated in just a few locations. There may be something in the soil that oxidizes the gas before it has a chance to spread. If this is so, that same chemical would destroy organic compounds, thus life would be very difficult on Mars.

== Craters ==
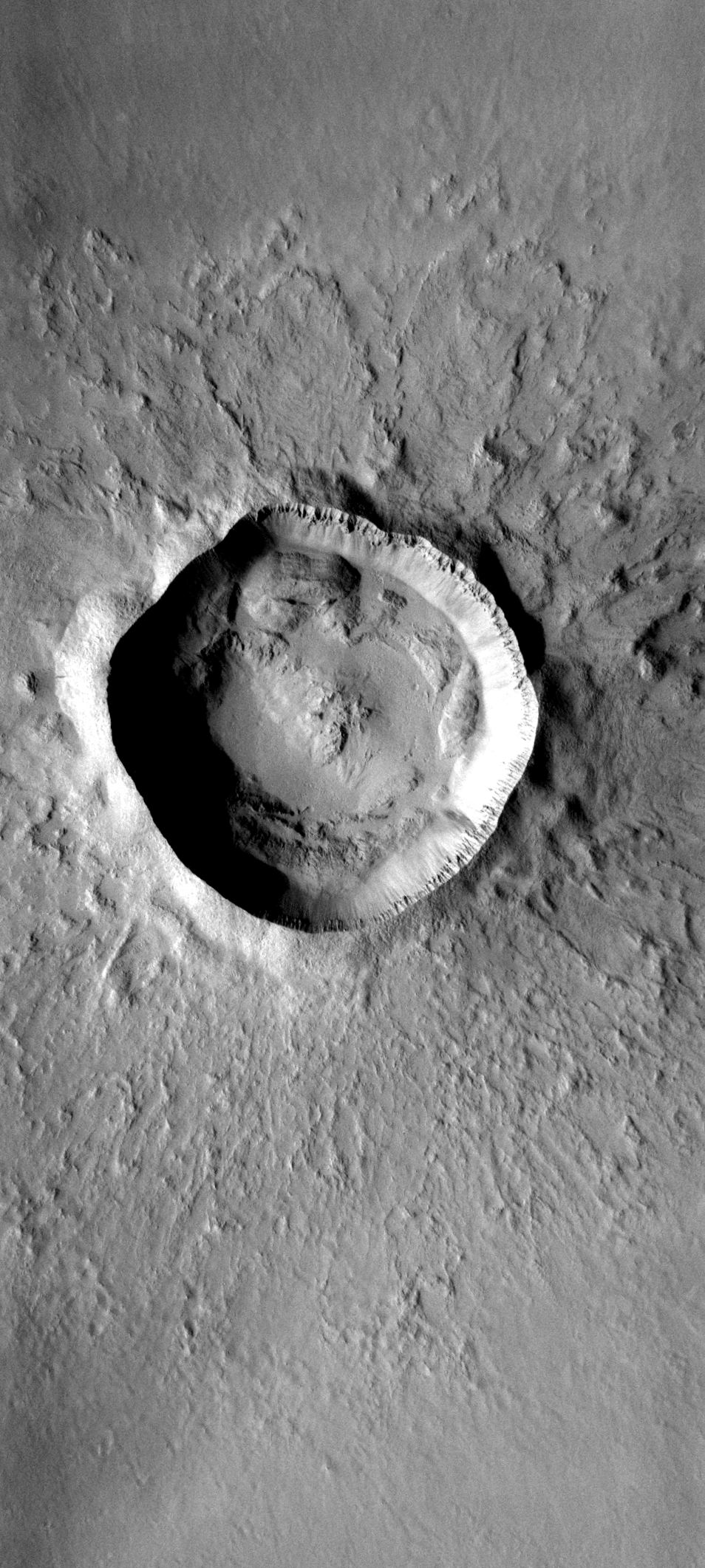
Zunil crater as seen by THEMIS

Impact craters generally have a rim with ejecta around them, in contrast volcanic craters usually do not have a rim or ejecta deposits. As craters get larger (greater than 10 km in diameter) they usually have a central peak. The peak is caused by a rebound of the crater floor following the impact. Sometimes craters will display layers. Since the collision that produces a crater is like a powerful explosion, rocks from deep underground are tossed unto the surface. Hence, craters can show us what lies deep under the surface.

Research published in the journal Icarus has found pits in Zunil Crater that are caused by hot ejecta falling on ground containing ice. The pits are formed by heat forming steam that rushes out from groups of pits simultaneously, thereby blowing away from the pit ejecta.

== Valles in the Elysium quadrangle ==
Some of the valleys in the Elysium quadrangle seem to start from grabens. Granicus Vallis and Tinjar Vallis begin at a graben that lies just to the west of Elysium Mons. Certain observations suggest that they may have been the location of lahars (mudflows). The graben may have formed because of volcanic dikes. Heat from the dikes would have melted a great deal of ice. Two valley systems, the Hephaestus Fossae and Hebrus Valles, have sections that join and branch at high angles.

The Athabasca Valles are perhaps the youngest outflow channel system on Mars. They lie 620 miles southeast of the large volcano Elysium Mons. Athabasca was formed by water that burst out of the Cerberus Fossae, a set of cracks or fissures in the ground. The Cerberus Fossae most likely were formed from the stress on the crust caused by the weight of both Elysium Mons and the Tharsis volcanoes. Current evidence suggests that Cerberus floods probably erupted in several stages. Near the start of these channels (at one of the Cerberus Fossae), the system is called the Athabasca Valles; to the south and east it is called Marte Vallis. Flow rates in Marte Vallis have been estimated at around 100 times that of the Mississippi River. Eventually, the system just seems to fade out in the plains of Amazonis Planitia.

== See also ==
- Methane on Mars
- Climate of Mars
- Fossa (geology)
- Geology of Mars
- Groundwater on Mars
- HiRISE
- Impact crater
- Lakes on Mars
- List of mountains on Mars
- List of quadrangles on Mars
- MOC Public Targeting Program
- Vallis
- Volcanology of Mars
- Water on Mars

MC-01 Mare Boreum (features)
MC-02 Diacria (features)		MC-03 Arcadia (features)	MC-04 Acidalium (features)	MC-05 Ismenius Lacus (features)		MC-06 Casius (features)	MC-07 Cebrenia (features)
MC-08 Amazonis (features)	MC-09 Tharsis (features)	MC-10 Lunae Palus (features)	MC-11 Oxia Palus (features)	MC-12 Arabia (features)	MC-13 Syrtis Major (features)	MC-14 Amenthes (features)	MC-15 Elysium (features)
MC-16 Memnonia (features)	MC-17 Phoenicis Lacus (features)	MC-18 Coprates (features)	MC-19 Margaritifer Sinus (features)	MC-20 Sinus Sabaeus (features)	MC-21 Iapygia (features)	MC-22 Mare Tyrrhenum (features)	MC-23 Aeolis (features)
MC-24 Phaethontis (features)		MC-25 Thaumasia (features)	MC-26 Argyre (features)	MC-27 Noachis (features)		MC-28 Hellas (features)	MC-29 Eridania (features)
MC-30 Mare Australe (features)
