= Elysium Fossae =

Martian geographical feature

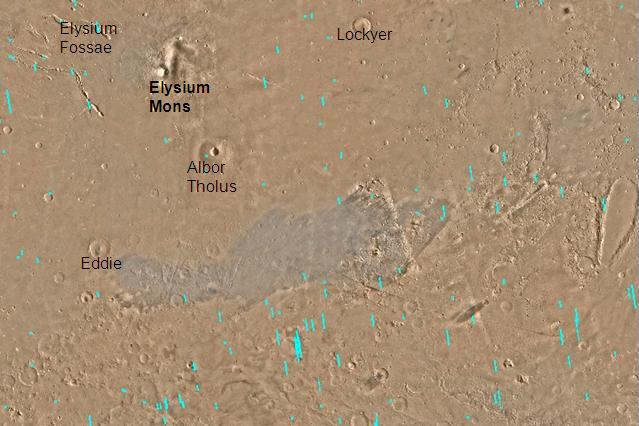
- Map of Elysium quadrangle. Elysium Mons and Albor Tholus are large volcanoes. The Elysium Fossae are in the upper left (northwest).
- Coordinates: 24.8°N 213.7°W

The Elysium Fossae are a group of large troughs in the Elysium quadrangle of Mars at 24.8° north latitude and 213.7° west longitude. They are about 1,175 km long and are named after a classical albedo feature name.

== Troughs ==
Large troughs (long narrow depressions) are called fossae in the geographical language used for Mars. Troughs are created when the crust is stretched until it breaks. The stretching can be due to the large weight of a nearby volcano. Fossae/pit craters are common near volcanoes in the Tharsis and Elysium system of volcanoes. A trough often has two breaks with a middle section moving down, leaving steep cliffs along the sides; such a trough is called a graben. Lake George, in northern New York State, is a lake that sits in a graben.

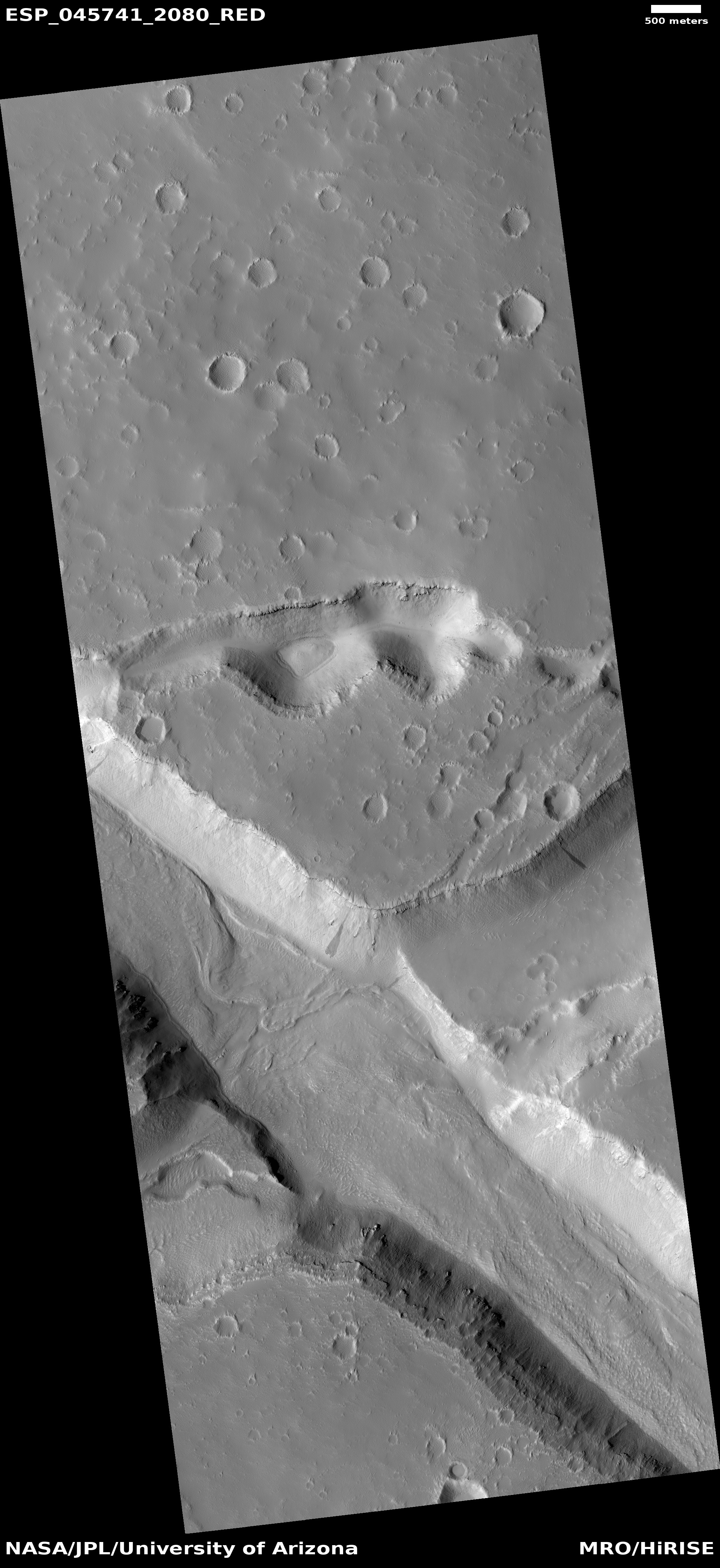
Troughs showing layers and dark slope streaks, as seen by HiRISE under HiWish program

== Layers ==
The Elysium Fossae contain layers, also called strata. Many places on Mars show rocks arranged in layers. Sometimes the layers are of different colors. Light-toned rocks on Mars have been associated with hydrated minerals like sulfates. The Mars rover Opportunity examined such layers close-up with several instruments. Some layers are probably made up of fine particles because they seem to break up into find dust. Other layers break up into large boulders so they are probably much harder. Basalt, a volcanic rock, is thought to in the layers that form boulders. Basalt has been identified on Mars in many places. Instruments on orbiting spacecraft have detected clay (also called phyllosilicates) in some layers. Scientists are excited about finding hydrated minerals such as sulfates and clays on Mars because they are usually formed in the presence of water. Places that contain clays and/or other hydrated minerals would be good places to look for evidence of life.

Rock can form layers in a variety of ways. Volcanoes, wind, or water can produce layers.

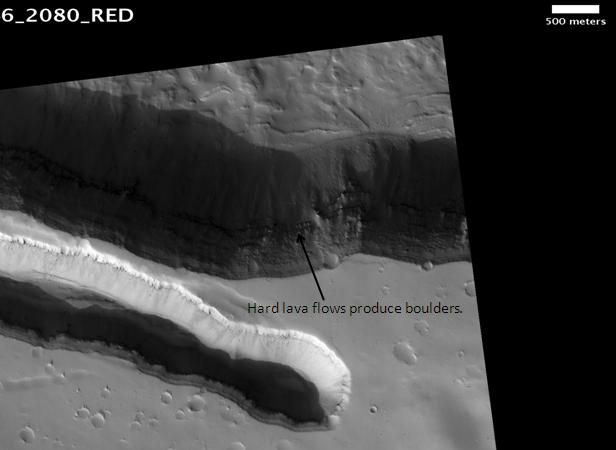
Elysium Fossae, as seen by HiRISE. Click on image to see layers.

== See also ==
- Fossa (geology)
- Geology of Mars
- HiRISE
- HiWish program
