= Cebrenia =

Cebrenia was an ancient country in the Troad, the hinterland of Troy, beside the Dardanelles in what is now Turkey.

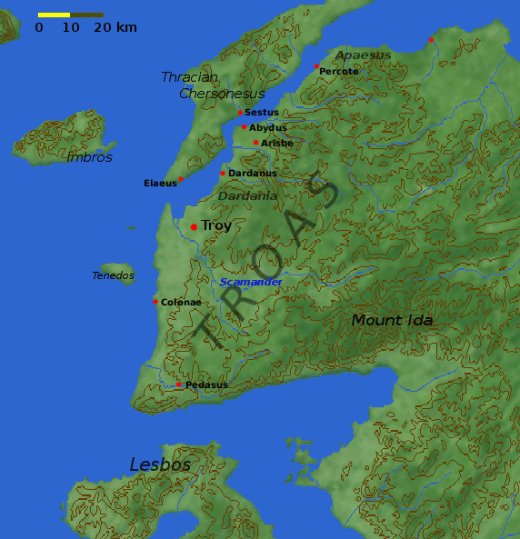
The Troad region in northwestern Anatolia

The location of Cebrenia was described by Strabo (c. 64 BCE–24 CE) in section 13.1.33 of his Geography:

Above them [the coastal cities near Troy] lies the plain of Troy, extending as far as Mount Ida to the east ... The part at the foot of the mountain is narrow ... This country Homer places under the command of Aeneas and the Antenoridae, and calls it Dardania. Below it is Cebrenia, which for the most part consists of plains, and lies nearly parallel to Dardania. There was also formerly a city Cybrene. ... Cebrenia extends as far as the Scepsian district. The boundary is the River Scamander, which runs through the middle of Cebrenia and Scepsia. There was continual enmity and war between the Scepsians and Cebrenians till Antigonus settled them both together in the city then called Antigonia, but at present Alexandria Troas. The Cebrenians remained there with the other inhabitants ...

Cebrenia is also briefly noted in Book 5, chapter 33 of Pliny's later Natural History, concerning Troas and the adjoining nations: "The first place in Troas is Hamaxitus, then Cebrenia, and then Troas itself, formerly called Antigonia, and now Alexandria, a Roman colony."

The name Cebrenia had mythological roots. Before Paris of Troy carried off Helen and started the Trojan War, he had been married to Oenone, a nymph whose father was the River Cebren, a tributary of the Scamander which gave its name to Cebrenia.

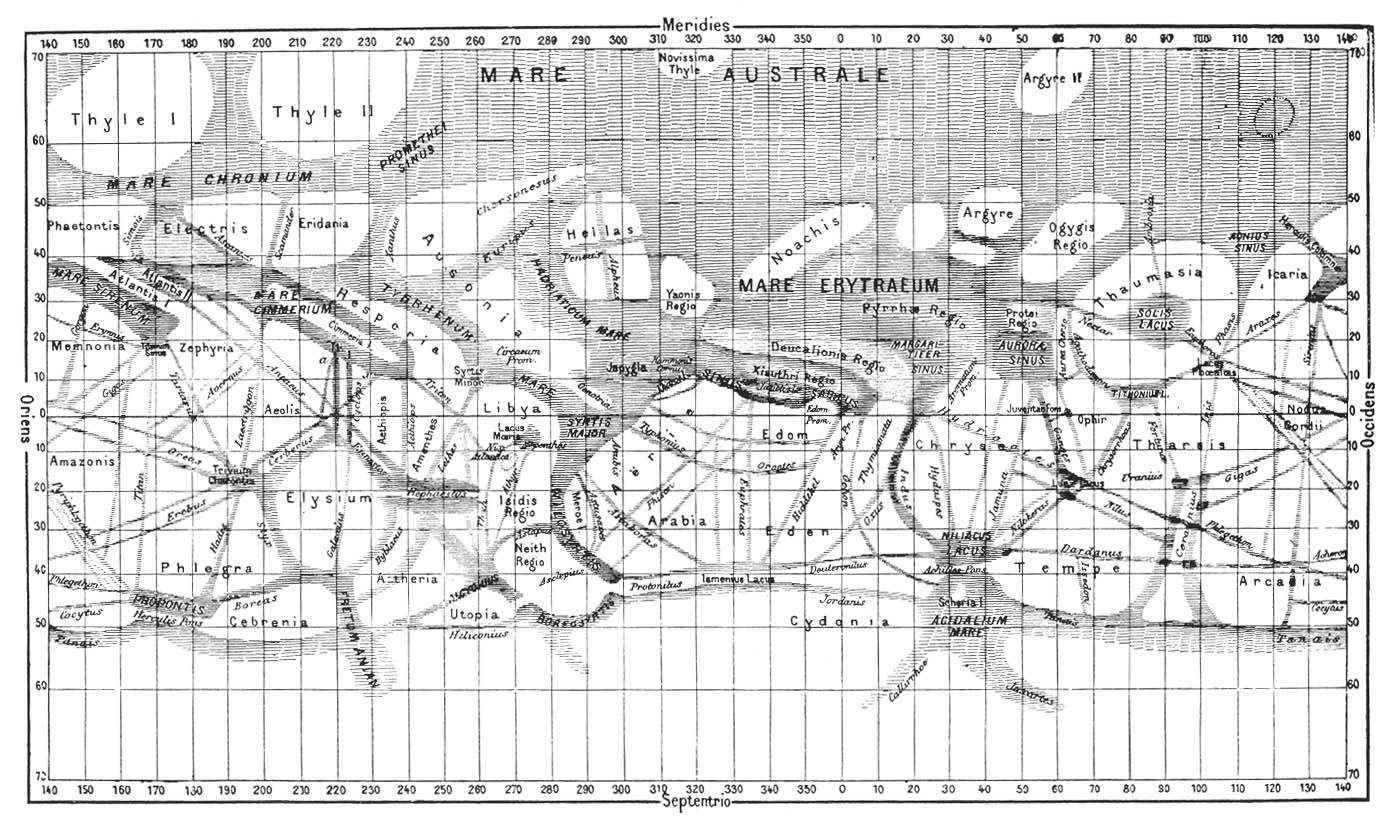
Schiaparelli's 1886 map of Mars has north at the bottom, so Cebrenia is at the lower left

When the 19th century astronomer Giovanni Schiaparelli was compiling his maps of Mars, he used the name Cebrenia for a mostly featureless area in the northern hemisphere, now known as the Cebrenia quadrangle.
