= Galaxias Fossae =

Martian fossae

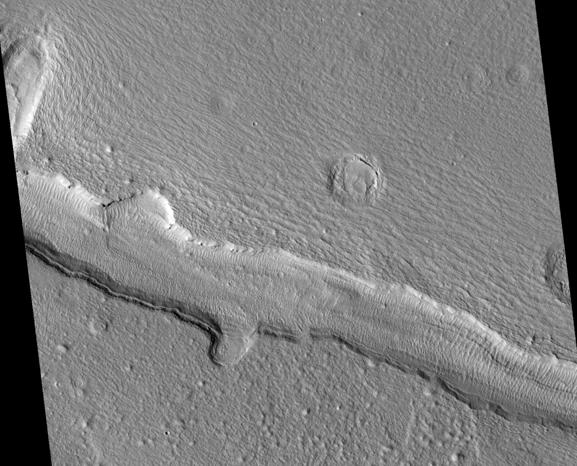
- Galaxias Fossae trough, as seen by HiRISE
- Coordinates: 36.67°N 218.27°W

The Galaxias Fossae are a group of troughs in the Cebrenia quadrangle of Mars, located at 36.67° North and 218.27° West. They are 532 km long and were named after an albedo feature name.

The term "fossae" is used to indicate large troughs when using geographical terminology related to Mars. Troughs, sometimes also called grabens, form when the crust is stretched until it breaks, which forms two breaks with a middle section moving down, leaving steep cliffs along the sides. Sometimes, a line of pits form as materials collapse into a void that forms from the stretching.

== See also ==
- Fossa (geology)
- Geology of Mars
- HiRISE
