= Cerberus Fossae =

Series of semi-parallel fissures on Mars formed by faults

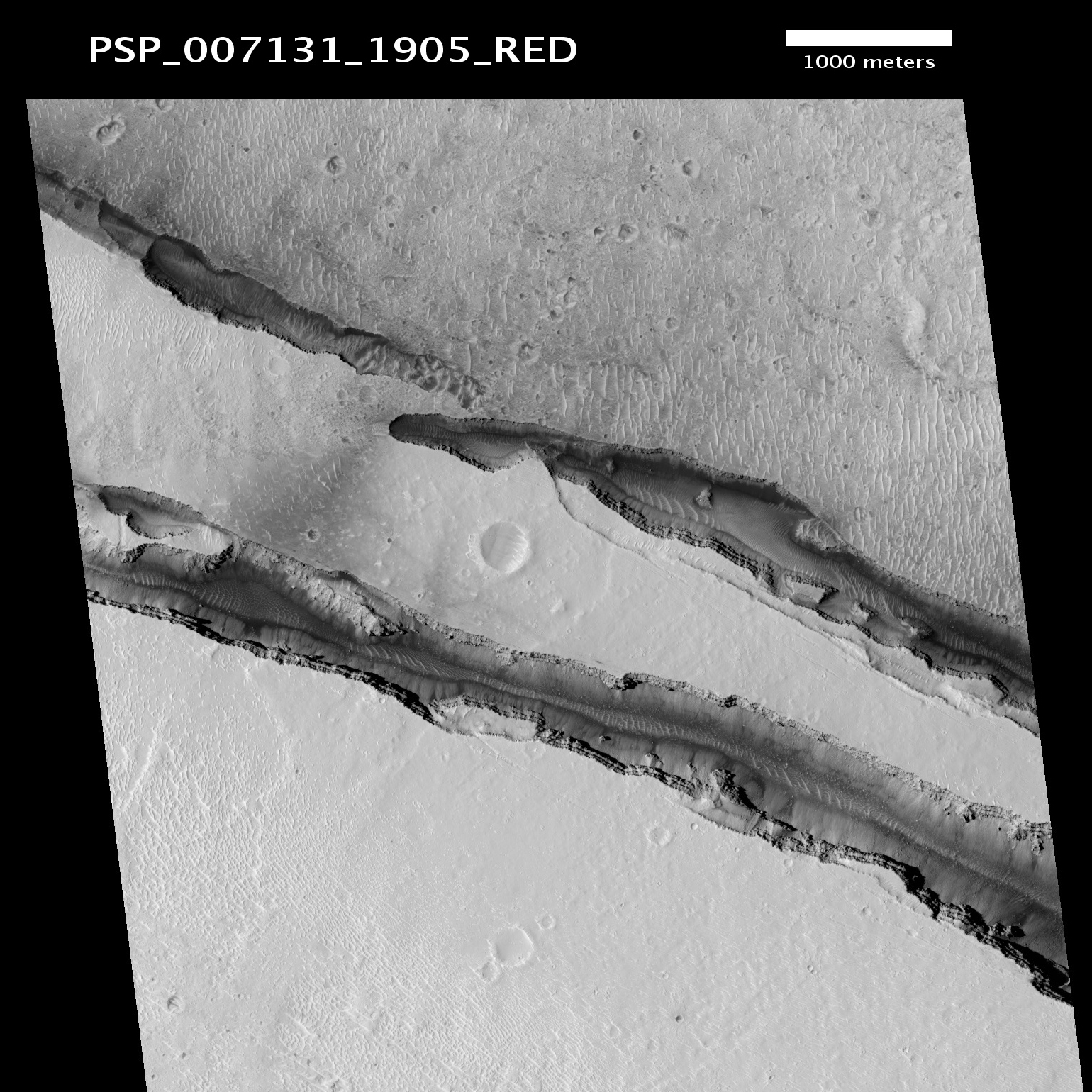
- Closeup of several Cerberus Fossae troughs, as seen by HiRISE (scale bar is 1.0 km)
- Coordinates: 11.9°N 188.8°E
- Length: 1,630.0 km
- Naming: From albedo feature at 10n, 212W. Changed from Cerberus Rupes.

The Cerberus Fossae are a series of semi-parallel fissures on Mars formed by faults which pulled the crust apart in the Cerberus region. They are 1235 km across and centered at 11.28 °N and 166.37 °E. Their northernmost latitude is 16.16 °N and their southernmost latitude 6.23 °N. Their easternmost and westernmost longitudes are 174.72 °E and 154.43 °E, respectively. They can be seen in the Elysium quadrangle.

Ripples seen at the bottom of the faults are sand blown by the wind. Numerical modeling of the forces in the crust of Mars suggest that the underlying cause for the faulting is the deformation caused by the Tharsis volcanoes to the east and Elysium to the west. The faults are quite young, cutting through pre-existing features such as the hills of the Tartarus Montes and the lava apron southeast of Elysium Mons. The formation of the fossae was suspected to have released pressurized underground water, previously confined by the cryosphere, with flow rates up to 2 million m^{3}/s, leading to the creation of the Athabasca Valles. Marte Vallis is another channel that was suggested to have formed from water released from Cerberus Fossae. Crater counts suggest this last outflow from the Cerberus Fossae took place about 2 to 10 million years ago. Later even younger (0.05-0.2 million years from present) volcanic deposit was detected, suggesting volcanic activity may be still ongoing.

There has been a suggestion such high discharges of water to the surface through these fissures are physically implausible and that lava was the fluid erupted from the Cerberus Fossae. The flood of lava would have had a volume of about 5,000 cubic kilometres (1,200 cu mi), typical of flood basalt eruptions on Earth. At these high discharges, lava behaved in many ways like a flood of water. The flowing lava eroded parts of the Athabasca Valles and then filled the Cerberus Palus basin. The rafted plates of lava in this 800 by 900 km (500 by 560 mi) temporary lava pond are similar in appearance to pack ice seen in the North Sea.

Some of the cracks are situated at the top of a topographic rise and are surrounded by flow features, indicating they served as volcanic vents, and others are on completely flat terrain without flow features, indicating they are fractures.

The Cerberus Fossae area has been positively identified as the first tectonically active region on Mars, with marsquakes being geolocated there by seismometer measurements from the NASA InSight lander in 2019; this activity was previously suspected on the basis of the trails of dislodged boulders.

In November 2020, astronomers reported newly found evidence for volcanic activity, as recently as 53,000 years ago, on the planet Mars. Such activity could have provided the environment with energy and chemicals needed to support life forms. This specific geological unit is where most of the current seismic activity of the planet is located.

== Gallery ==
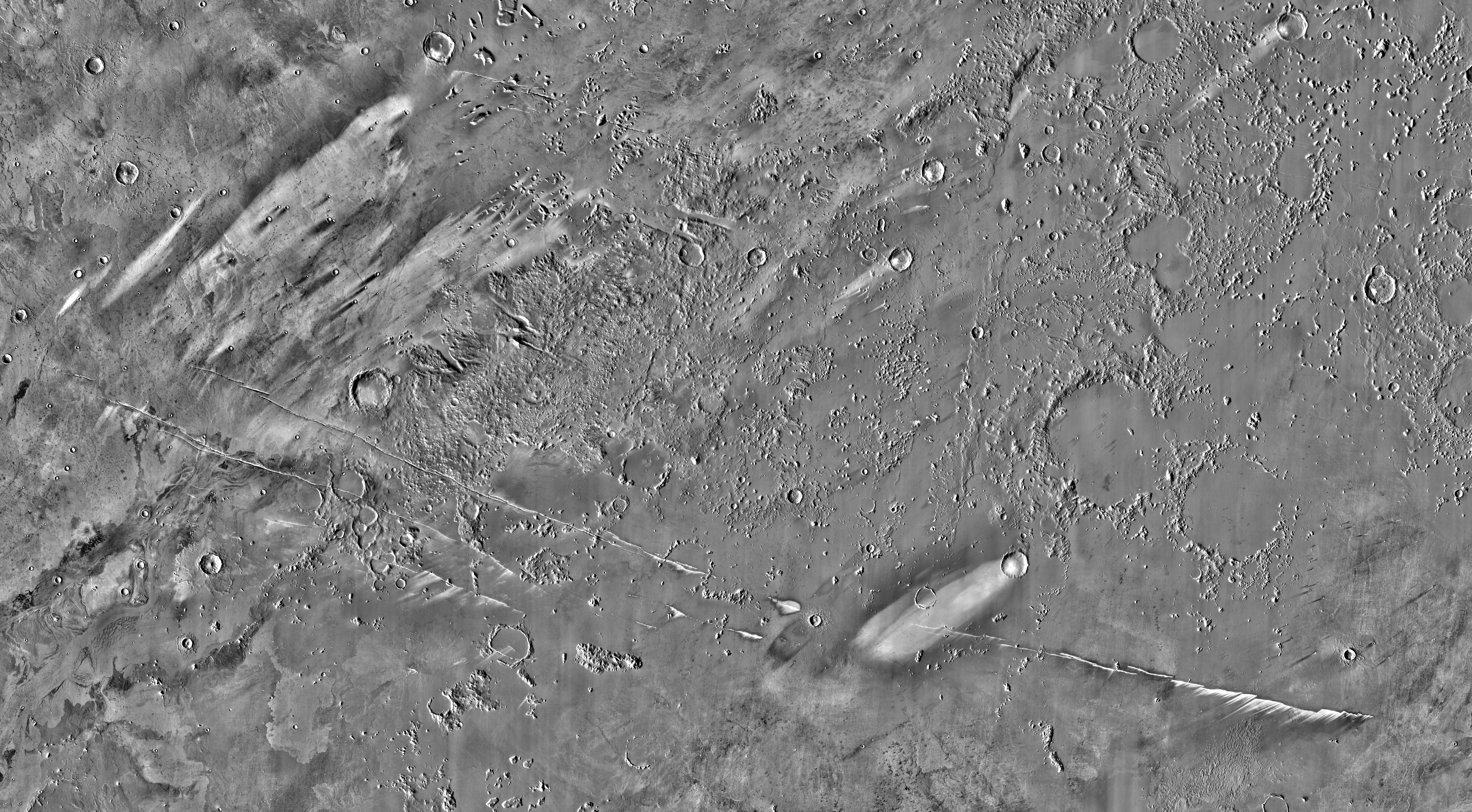
THEMIS mosaic of the Cerberus Fossae region. The Athabasca Valles outflow channels emerge from fissures at lower left. (The large image may be more easily viewed at full resolution with ZoomViewer.)

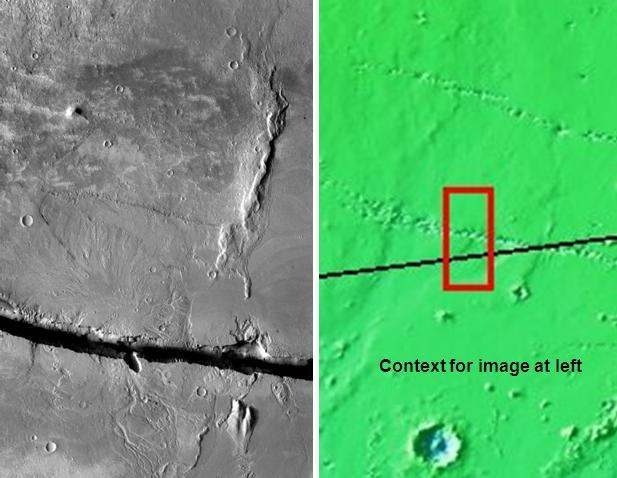
One of the Cerberus Fossae, as seen by THEMIS

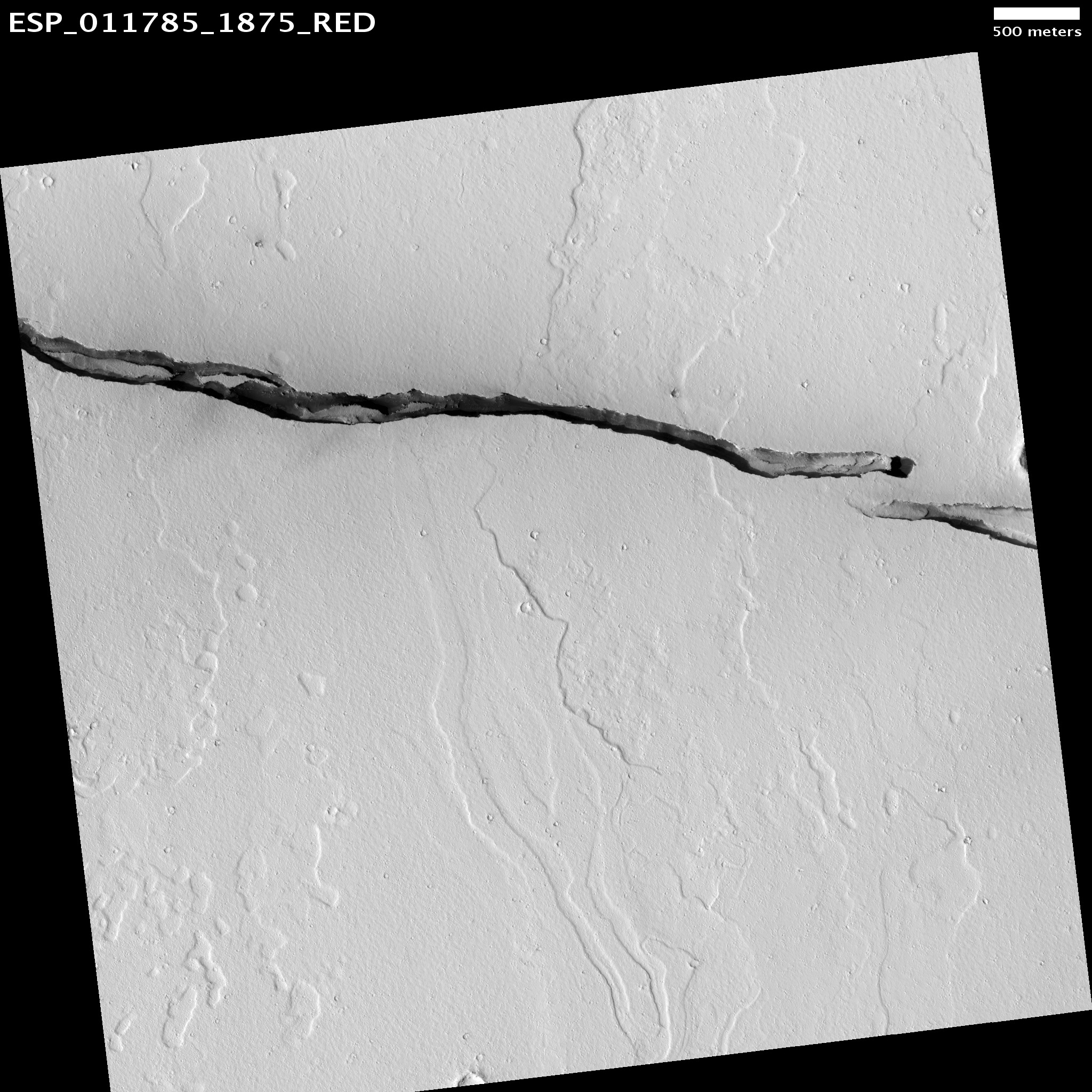
Wind-blown material darkens areas around a Cerberus Fossae trough (scale bar for HiRISE image is 500 m)

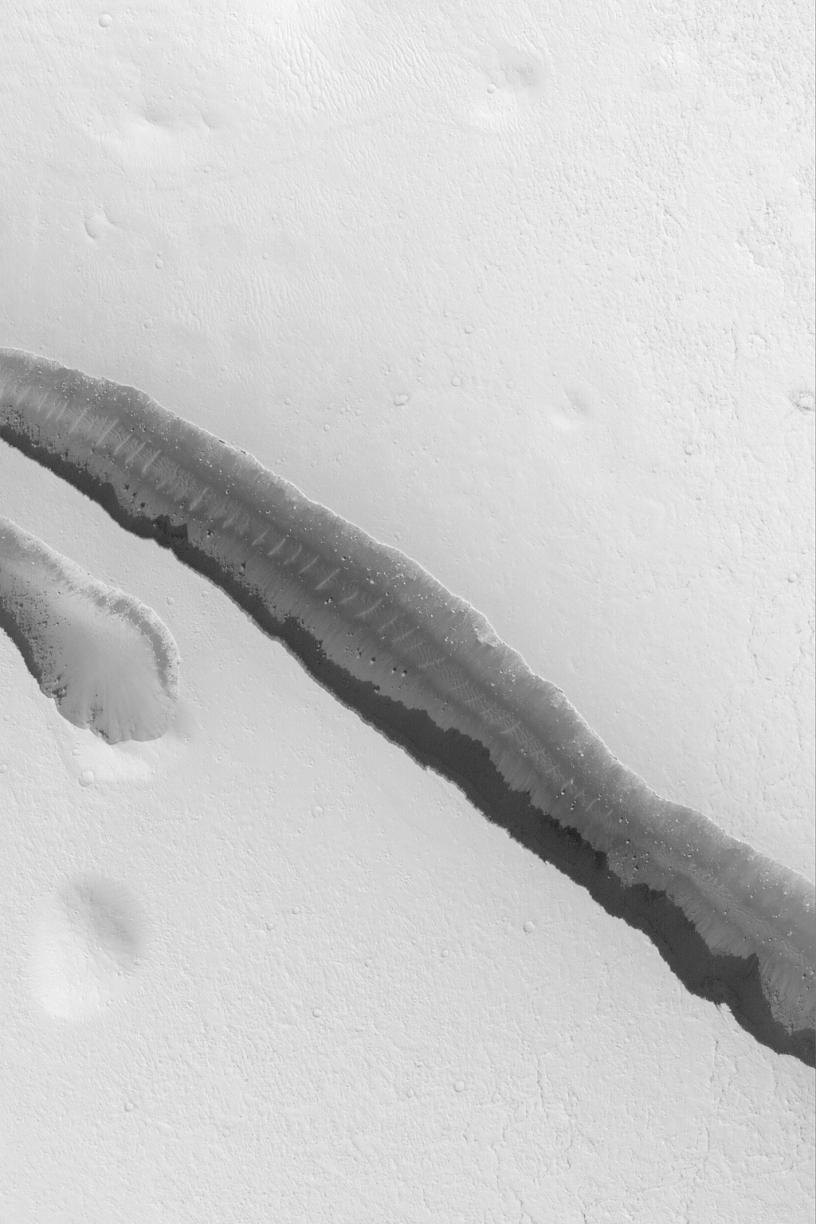
A 3 km section of a Cerberus Fossae fissure, taken by the Mars Global Surveyor (MGS) Mars Orbiter Camera (MOC)

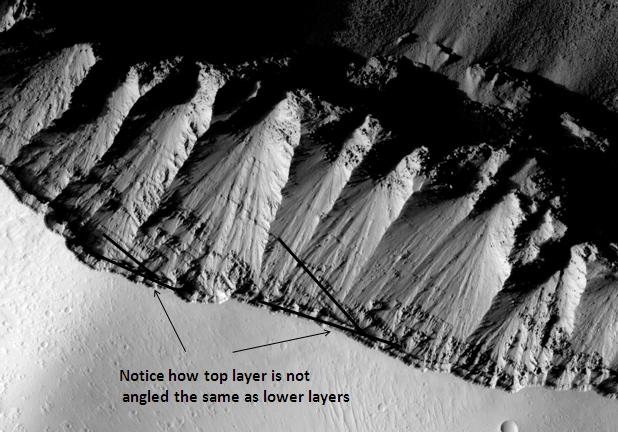
Angular unconformity in the Cerberus Fossae, as seen by HiRISE (click on image to see the angles of the layers)

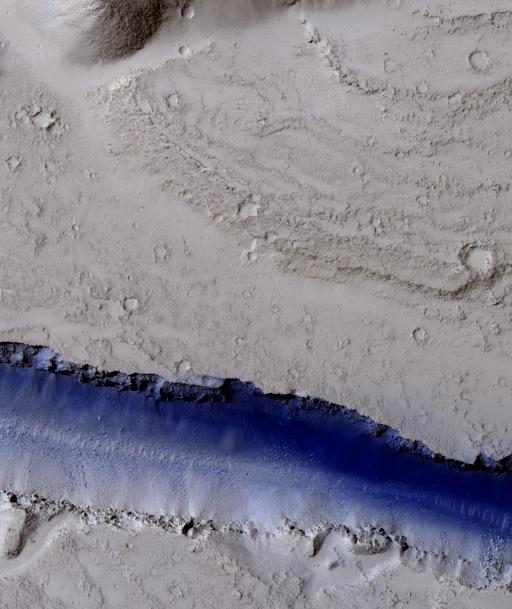
Portion of a trough (fossa) in Elysium, as seen by HiRISE under the HiWish program (blue indicates probably seasonal frost)

== See also ==
- Fossa (planetary nomenclature) – Long, narrow, shallow depression
- Geology of Mars – Scientific study of the surface, crust, and interior of the planet Mars
- HiRISE – Camera on board the Mars Reconnaissance Orbiter
- HiWish program – NASA program for public suggestions for MRO images
- Lakes on Mars – Former bodies of water on Mars
