= Hecates Tholus =

Martian volcano

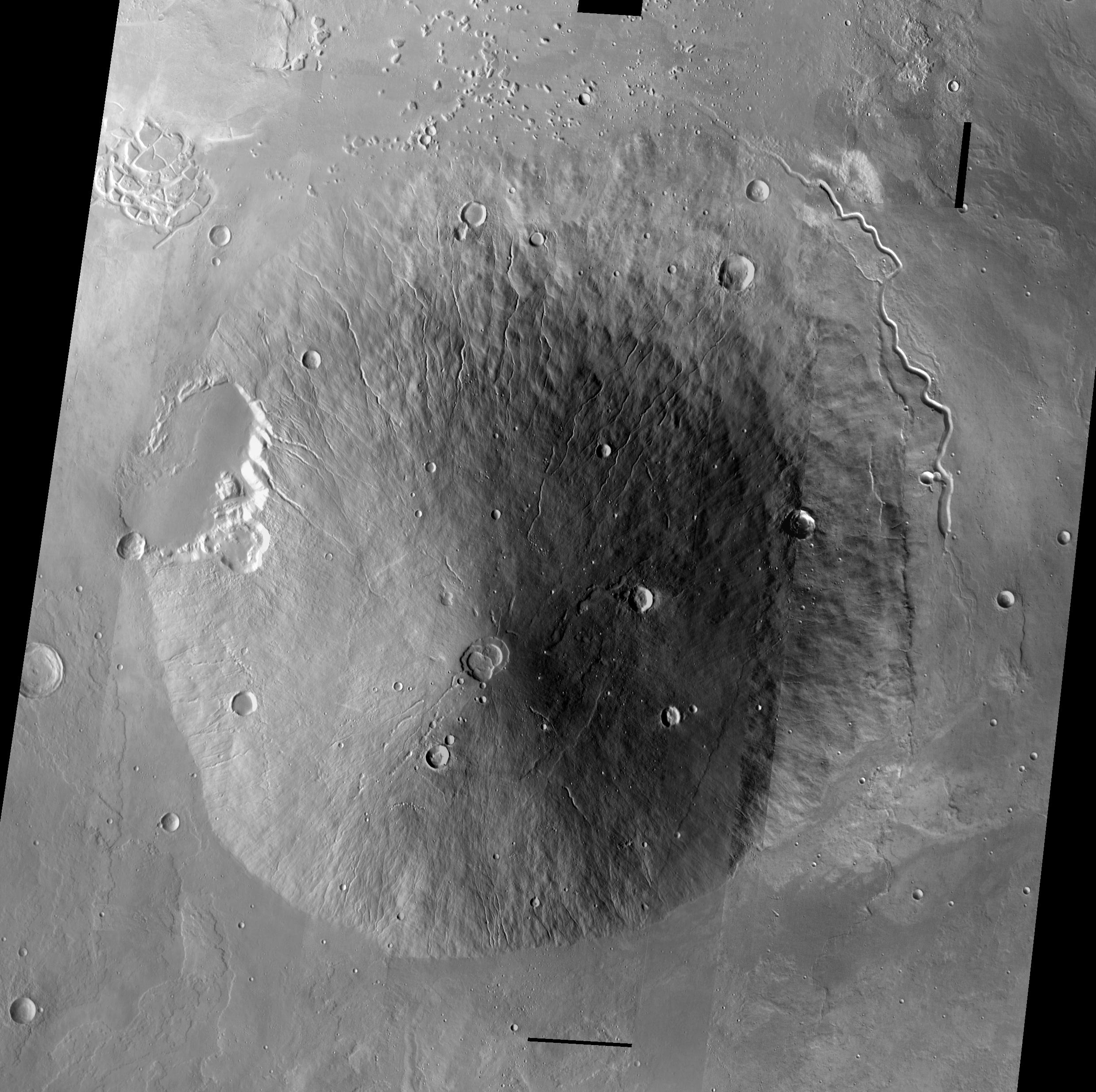
- 2001 Mars Odyssey THEMIS daytime infrared image mosaic
- Coordinates: 32.12°N 150.24°E
- Eponym: Hecate

Hecates Tholus is a Martian volcano, notable for results from the European Space Agency's Mars Express mission which indicate a major eruption took place 350 million years ago. The eruption created a caldera 10 km in diameter on the volcano's western flank.

The volcano is at location 32.12°N 150.24°E, in the volcanic province Elysium, and has a diameter of 182 km. It is the northernmost of the Elysium volcanoes; the others are Elysium Mons and Albor Tholus. Hecates Tholus is in the Cebrenia quadrangle.

== Origin of name ==
In planetary nomenclature, a "tholus" is a "small domical mountain or hill". Hecates is named after Hecate, the goddess of the ghost-world, nightly events, and sorcery.

== Observation history ==
Hecates Tholus was first named in 1973. In 2004, ESA's High Resolution Stereo Camera and NASA's Thermal Emission Imaging System both took pictures of the region from orbit. These observations showed that this region was more complex than previously assumed, and multiple papers were published using the new data.

== Formation ==
The eruption which formed the caldera of Hecates Tholus took place 350 million years ago. However, the volcano itself dates back to the Hesperian period of Mars's history, and is at least 3.8 billion years old. Volcanic activity lasted until at least 335 million years ago, and potentially as recent as 100 million years ago. There are at least 5 concentric calderas at the summit; there is some disagreement about the ages of the calderas, most notably the fourth and fifth calderas for which age estimations differ by a factor of ten when one chooses whether or not to factor external lava flows into the age estimation process.

It has been suggested that glacial deposits later partly filled the caldera and an adjacent depression. Crater counts indicate this happened as recently as 5 to 20 million years ago, and potentially as recently as 440,000 years ago. Glacial events have been occurring since as far back as 1.4 billion years ago. The valleys of Hecates Tholus are expected to have been formed by meltwater from these glaciers. However climate models show that ice is not stable at Hecates Tholus today, pointing to climate change since the glaciers were active. It has been shown that the age of the glaciers correspond to a period of increased obliquity of Mars's rotational axis.

The western flank is expected to have been resurfaced in the Late Amazonian period, due to its lack of craters relative to the rest of the volcano. While craters are useful in dating Martian volcanos, it has proven difficult to apply this method too Hecates Tholus.

== Gallery ==
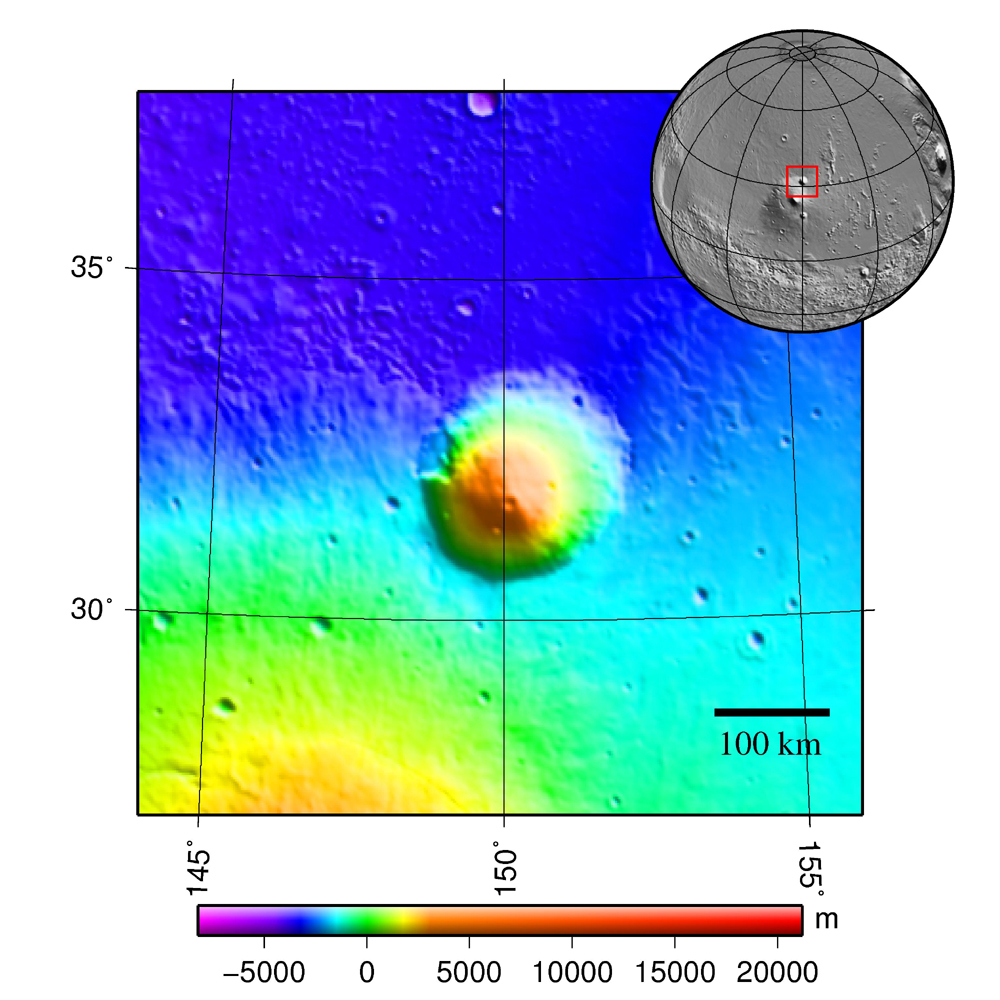
Hecates Tholus topography.

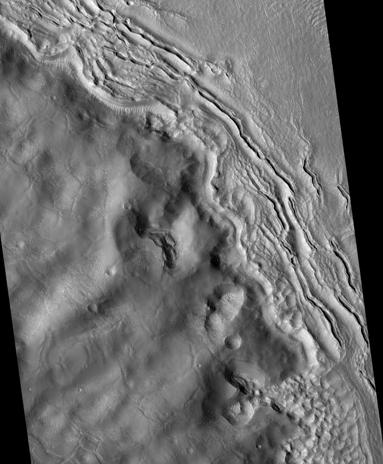
Hecates Tholus ridges, as seen by HiRISE. Ridges are to the west-northwest of Hecates Tholus. It has been proposed that this region was affected by a volcanic eruption that occurred under a 200 meter-thick ice sheet.

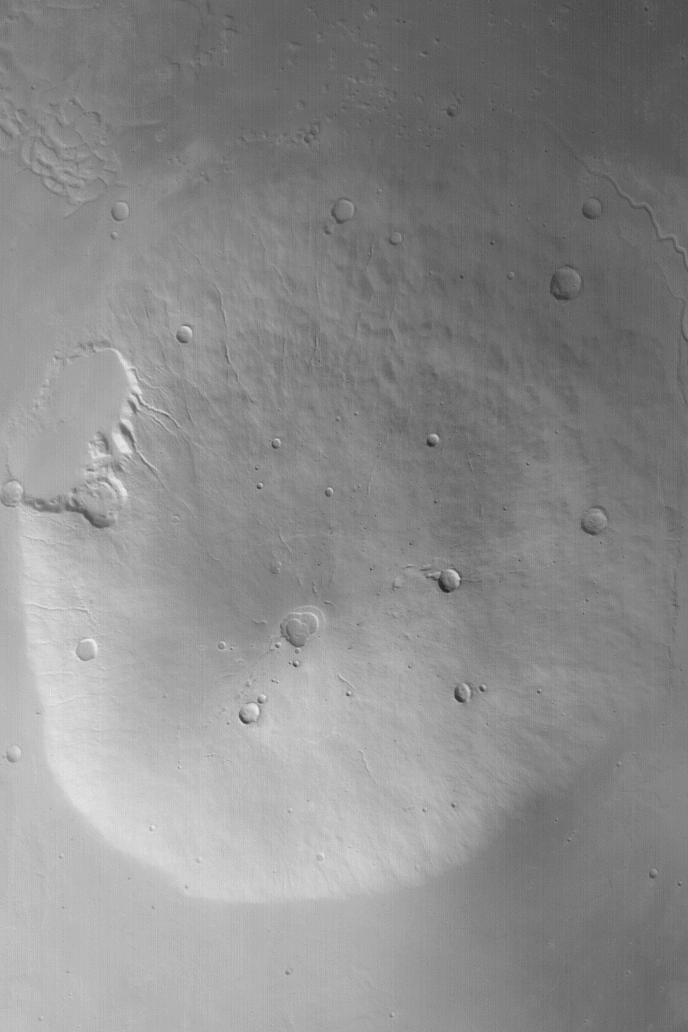
Mars Global Surveyor Mars Orbiter Camera image.

== See also ==
- Climate of Mars
- Geography of Mars
- Geology of Mars
- HiRISE
- List of mountains on Mars by height
- Volcanoes on Mars
- Volcanology of Mars
