= Albor Tholus =

Martian volcano

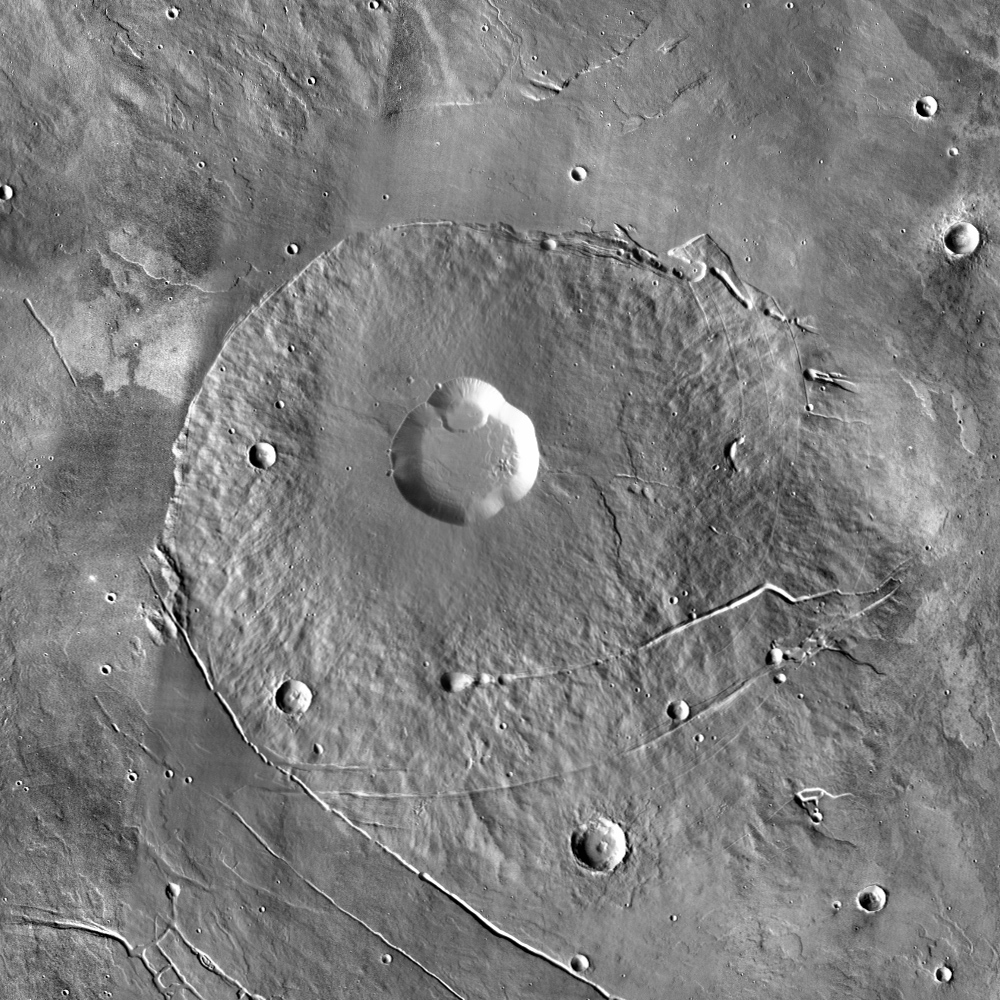
- 2001 Mars Odyssey THEMIS daytime infrared image mosaic
- Feature type: Shield volcano
- Coordinates: 18.87°N 150.47°E

Albor Tholus is an extinct volcano in the volcanic province Elysium on Mars. It lies south of the neighbouring volcanoes Elysium Mons and Hecates Tholus. Albor Tholus is 4.5 kilometres high and has a diameter of 160 km at its base. Its large caldera, having a diameter of 30 km and a depth of 3 km, is deep compared to calderas on the Earth. The elevation of the lowest level of the caldera is the same as the base of the volcano; however, the original lower slopes of Albor Tholus may have been covered by lava flows from its larger neighbor, Elysium Mons. Evaluations by the Mars probe Mars Express found that the volcanoes of the Elysium region were active over long periods.

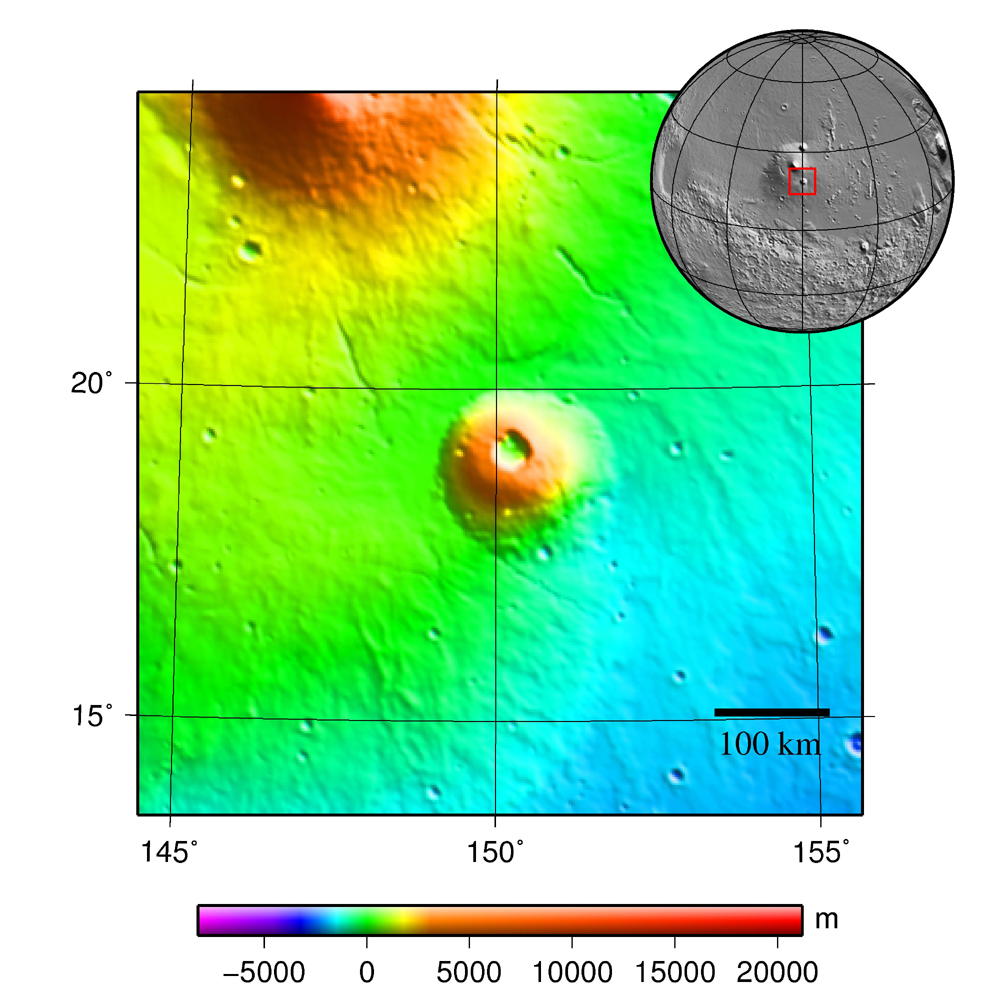
Topography of Albor Tholus and its neighborhood.

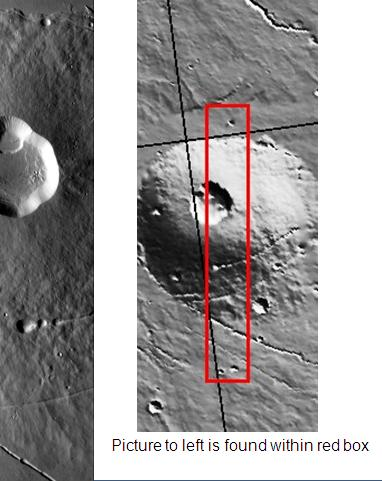
Albor Tholus as seen by THEMIS. The area has undergone extensive faulting.
