= Cebrenia quadrangle =

One of 30 quadrangle maps of Mars used by the US Geological Survey

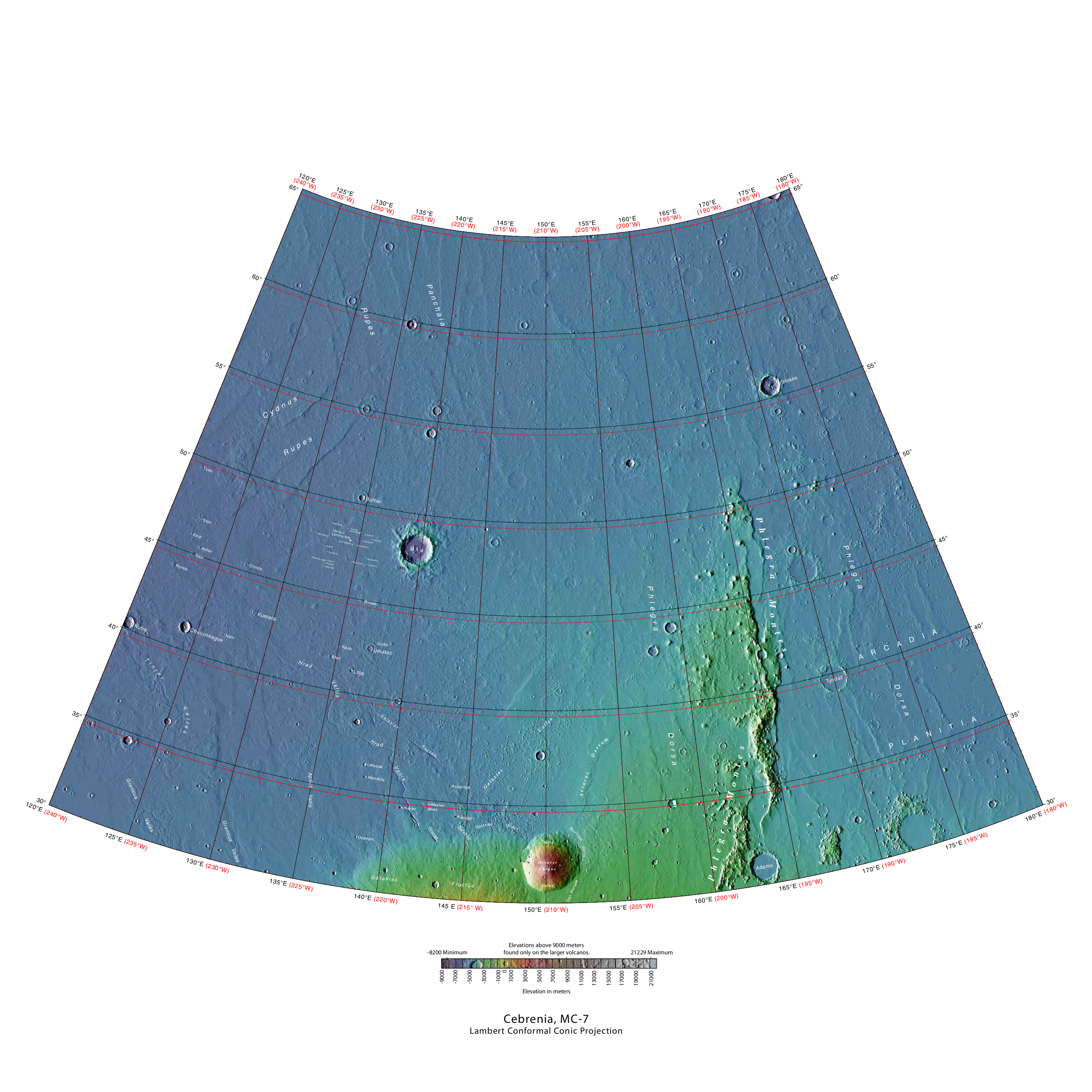
- Elevation map of Cebrenia quadrangle from Mars Orbiter Laser Altimeter (MOLA) data.
- Coordinates: 47.5°N 210°W
- Eponym: Land of Cebrenia near Troy

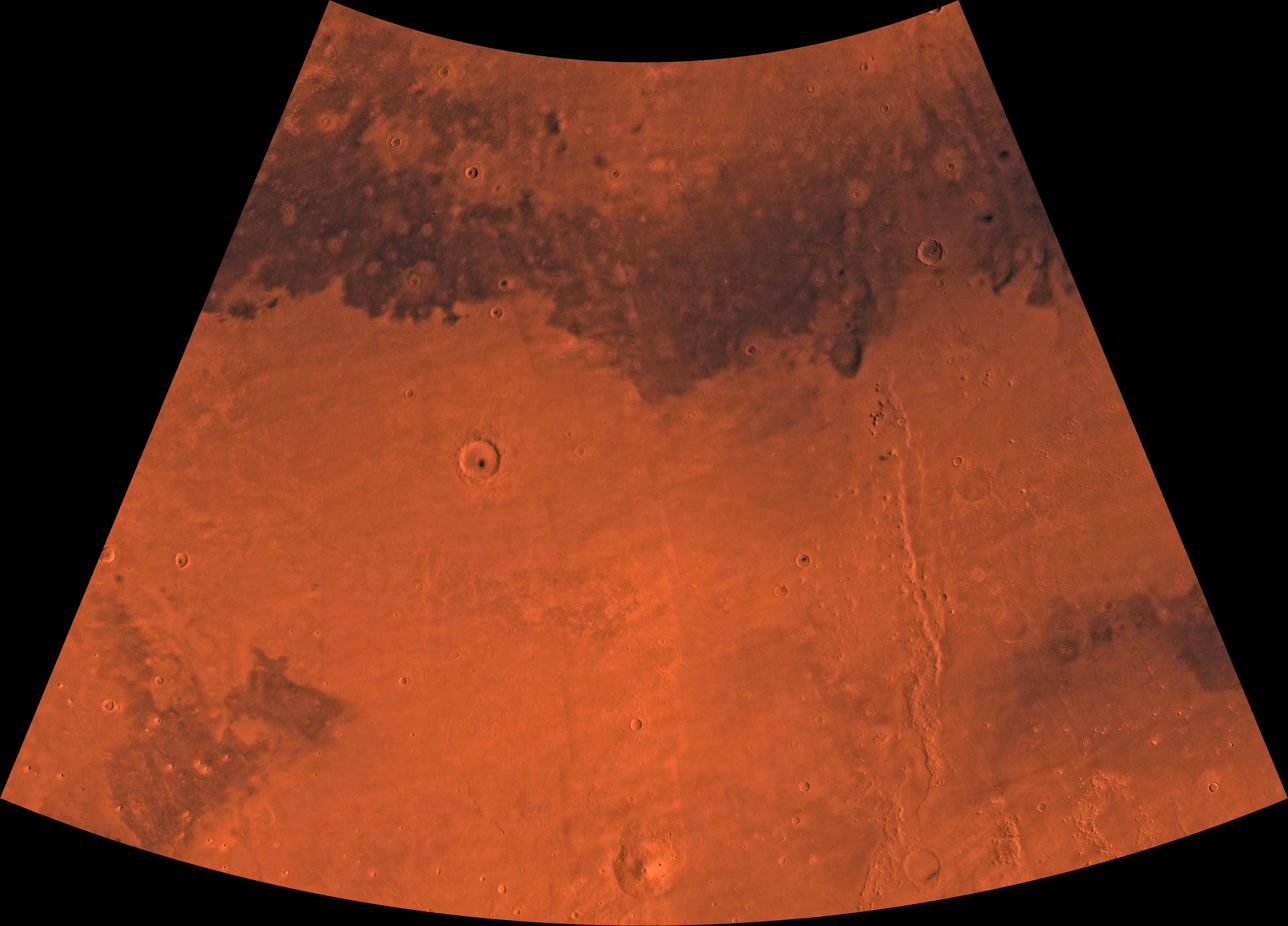
Image of the Cebrenia Quadrangle (MC-7). The northwest contains relatively smooth plains; the southeast contains Hecates Tholus (one of three Elysium shield volcanoes) and Phlegra Montes (a ridge system).

The Cebrenia quadrangle is one of a series of 30 quadrangle maps of Mars used by the United States Geological Survey (USGS) Astrogeology Research Program. The quadrangle is located in the northeastern portion of Mars' eastern hemisphere and covers 120° to 180° east longitude (180° to 240° west longitude) and 30° to 65° north latitude. The quadrangle uses a Lambert conformal conic projection at a nominal scale of 1:5,000,000 (1:5M). The Cebrenia quadrangle is also referred to as MC-7 (Mars Chart-7). It includes part of Utopia Planitia and Arcadia Planitia. The southern and northern borders of the Cebrenia quadrangle are approximately 3,065 km (1,905 mi) and 1,500 km (930 mi) wide, respectively. The north to south distance is about 2,050 km (1,270 mi) (slightly less than the length of Greenland). The quadrangle covers an approximate area of 4,900,000 square kilometres (1,900,000 sq mi), about 3% of Mars' surface area.

== Etymology ==
The feature is named after Cebrenia, a country near ancient Troy. The name was approved by the International Astronomical Union (IAU) in 1958.

== Physiography and geology ==
The quadrangle's prominent features are the large craters Mie and Stokes, a volcano, Hecates Tholus, and a group of mountains, Phlegra Montes.

Viking 2 (part of Viking program) landed near Mie on September 3, 1976. Its landing coordinates were 48° N and 226° W.

== See also ==
- Climate of Mars
- Geology of Mars
- Glacier
- Glaciers on Mars
- HiRISE
- HiWish program
- Impact crater
- Latitude dependent mantle
- Lineated valley fill
- List of quadrangles on Mars
- List of mountains on Mars
- List of rocks on Mars
- Martian chaos terrain
- Pedestal crater
- Vallis
- Volcanology of Mars
- Water on Mars

MC-01 Mare Boreum (features)
MC-02 Diacria (features)		MC-03 Arcadia (features)	MC-04 Acidalium (features)	MC-05 Ismenius Lacus (features)		MC-06 Casius (features)	MC-07 Cebrenia (features)
MC-08 Amazonis (features)	MC-09 Tharsis (features)	MC-10 Lunae Palus (features)	MC-11 Oxia Palus (features)	MC-12 Arabia (features)	MC-13 Syrtis Major (features)	MC-14 Amenthes (features)	MC-15 Elysium (features)
MC-16 Memnonia (features)	MC-17 Phoenicis Lacus (features)	MC-18 Coprates (features)	MC-19 Margaritifer Sinus (features)	MC-20 Sinus Sabaeus (features)	MC-21 Iapygia (features)	MC-22 Mare Tyrrhenum (features)	MC-23 Aeolis (features)
MC-24 Phaethontis (features)		MC-25 Thaumasia (features)	MC-26 Argyre (features)	MC-27 Noachis (features)		MC-28 Hellas (features)	MC-29 Eridania (features)
MC-30 Mare Australe (features)
