= Elysium Mons =

Martian volcano

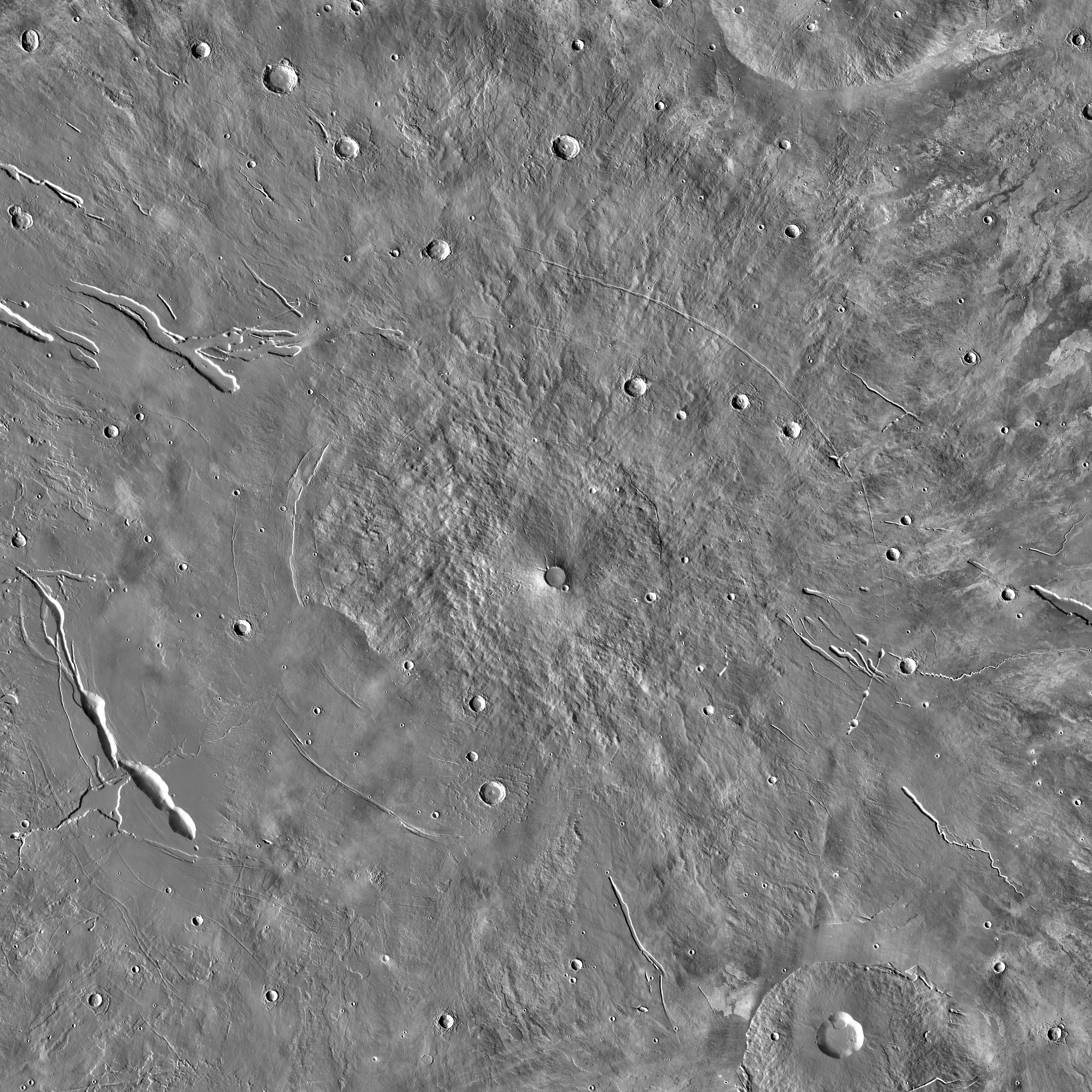
- 2001 Mars Odyssey THEMIS daytime infrared image mosaic
- Feature type: Shield volcano
- Coordinates: 25.02°N 147.21°E
- Peak: 12.6 km (7.8 mi) 41,338 ft (12,600 m) above plains; 16 kilometres (52,000 ft) above datum
- Discoverer: Mariner 9

Elysium Mons /ɪˈlɪziəm ˈmɒnz/ is a volcano on Mars located in the volcanic province Elysium, in the Martian eastern hemisphere. It stands about 12.6 km (41,000 ft) above its base, and about 14.1 km (46,000 ft) above the Martian datum, making it the third tallest Martian mountain in terms of relief and the fourth highest in elevation. Its diameter is about 240 km (150 mi), with a summit caldera about 14 km (8.7 mi) across. It is flanked by the smaller volcanoes Hecates Tholus to the northeast, and Albor Tholus to the southeast.

== Discovery ==
Elysium Mons was discovered in 1972 in images returned by the Mariner 9 orbiter.

== Terrestrial analog ==
The terrestrial volcano Emi Koussi (in Chad) has been studied as an analog of Elysium Mons. The two shield volcanoes have summit calderas of similar size, but Elysium Mons is 3.5 times larger in diameter and 6 times higher than its counterpart on Earth.

== Possible source of nakhlites ==
A 6.5 km diameter crater at 29.674 N, 130.799 E, in the volcanic plains to the northwest of Elysium Mons has been identified as a possible source for the nakhlite meteorites, a family of similar basaltic Martian meteorites with cosmogenic ages of about 10.7 Ma, suggesting ejection from Mars by a single impact event. The dates of the igneous rocks of the nakhlites range from 1416 ± 7 Ma to 1322 ± 10 Ma. These dates plus the crater dimensions suggest a growth rate of the source volcano during that interval of 0.4–0.7 m per Ma, far slower than would be expected for a terrestrial volcano. This implies that Martian volcanism had slowed greatly by that point in history.

== Gallery ==
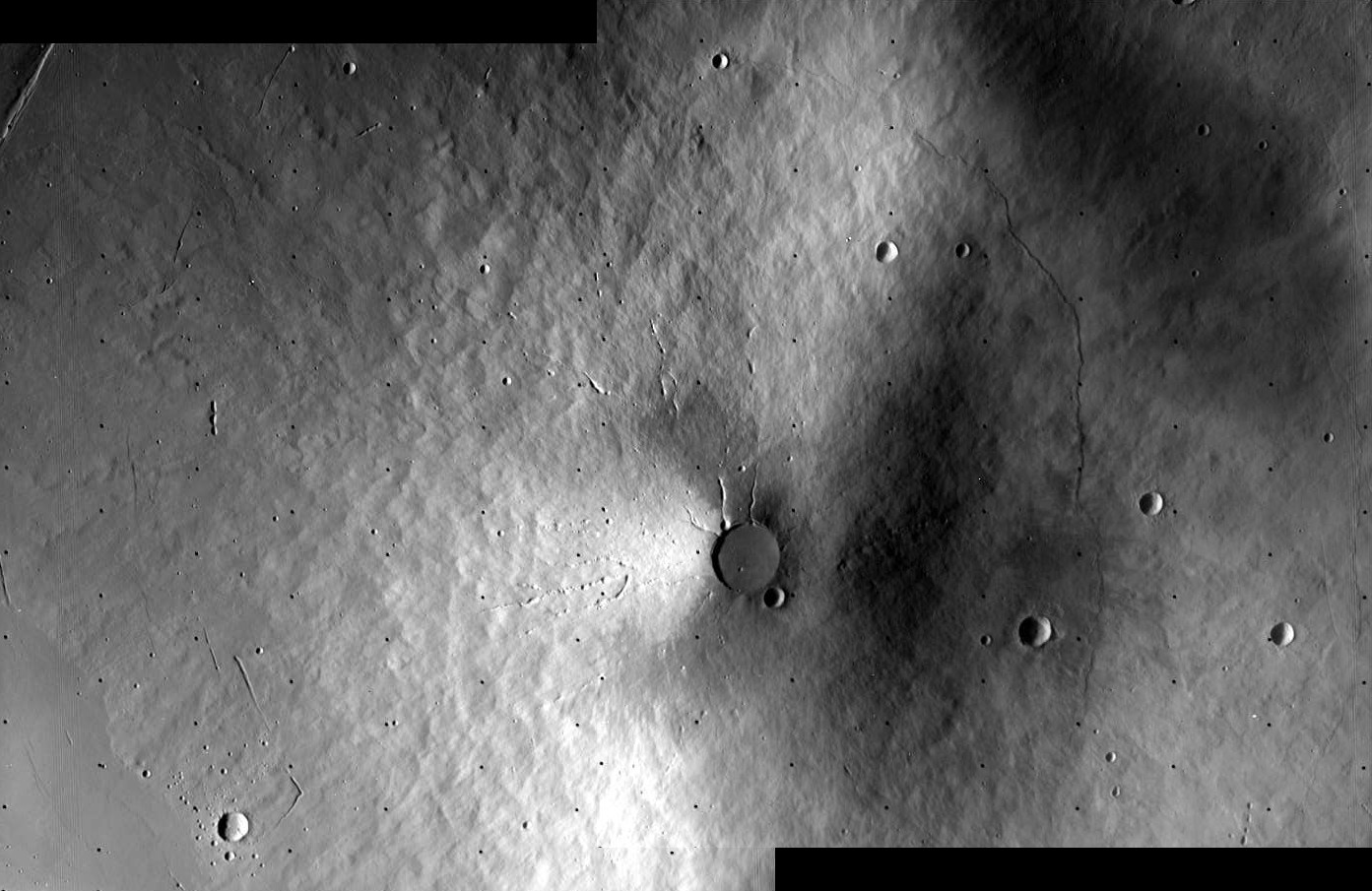
Viking Orbiter 1 mosaic (1977)

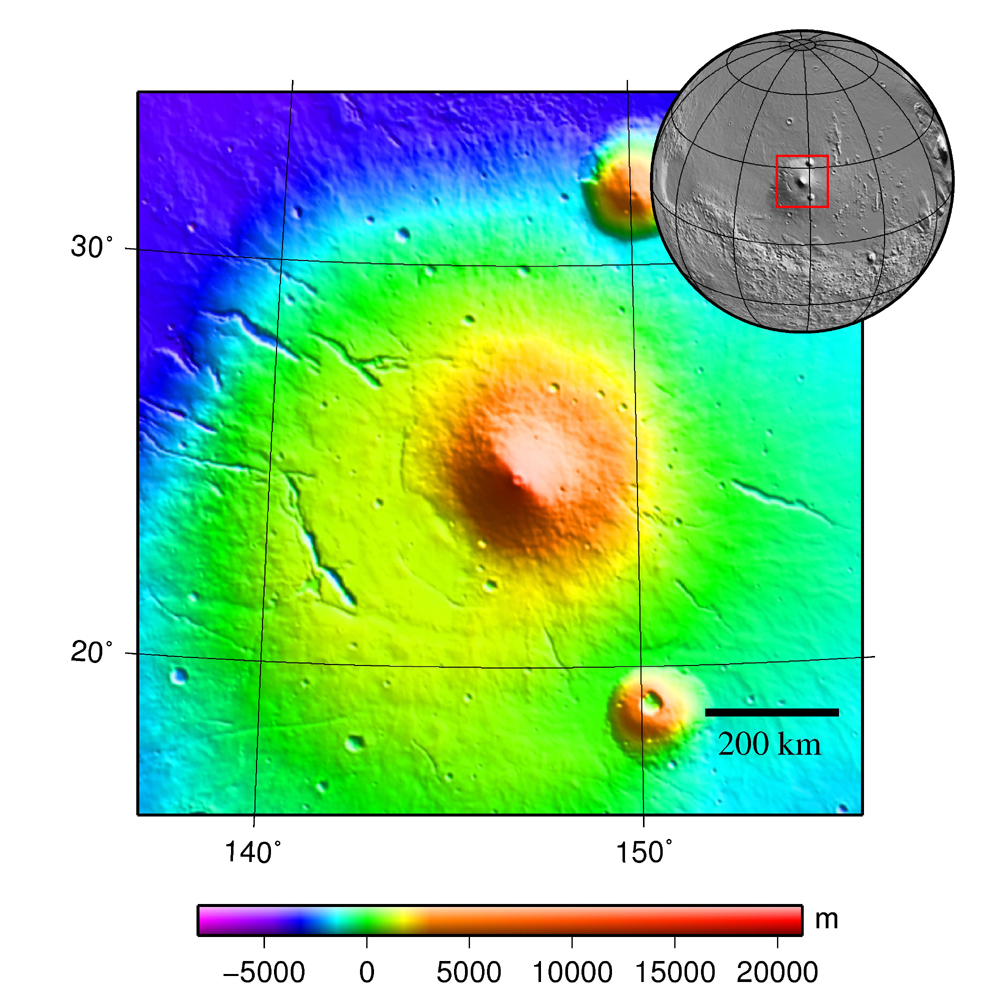
Topography of the Elysium Mons area, from MOLA

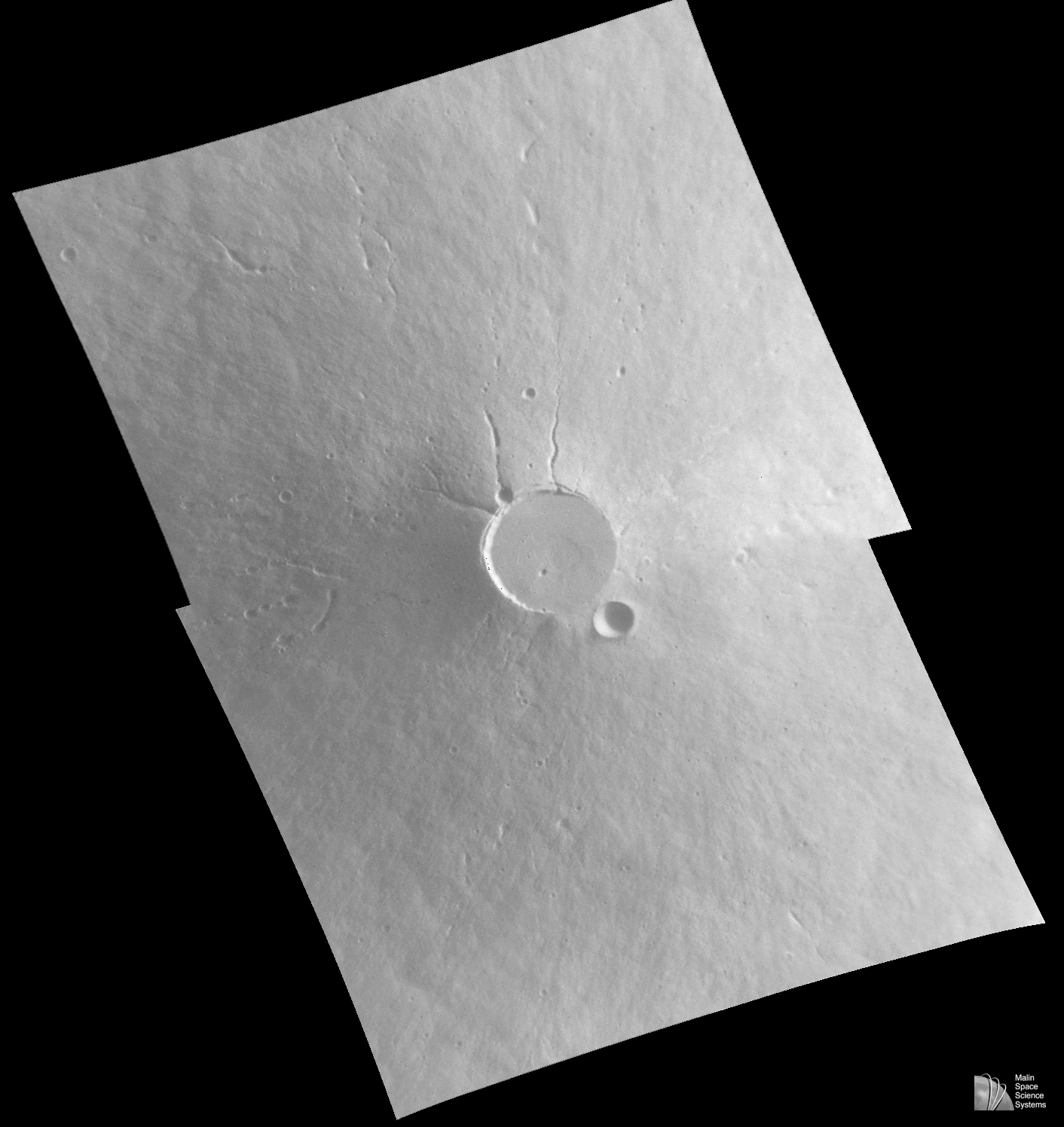
Mars Global Surveyor view of the summit area

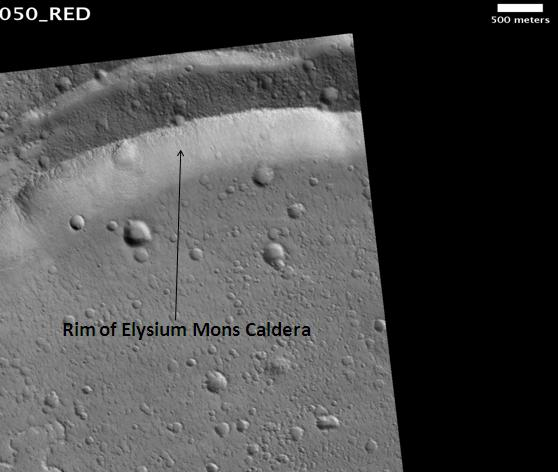
Rim of Elysium Mons caldera, as seen by HiRISE

== See also ==
- Geography of Mars
- List of mountains on Mars by height
- List of tallest mountains in the Solar System
