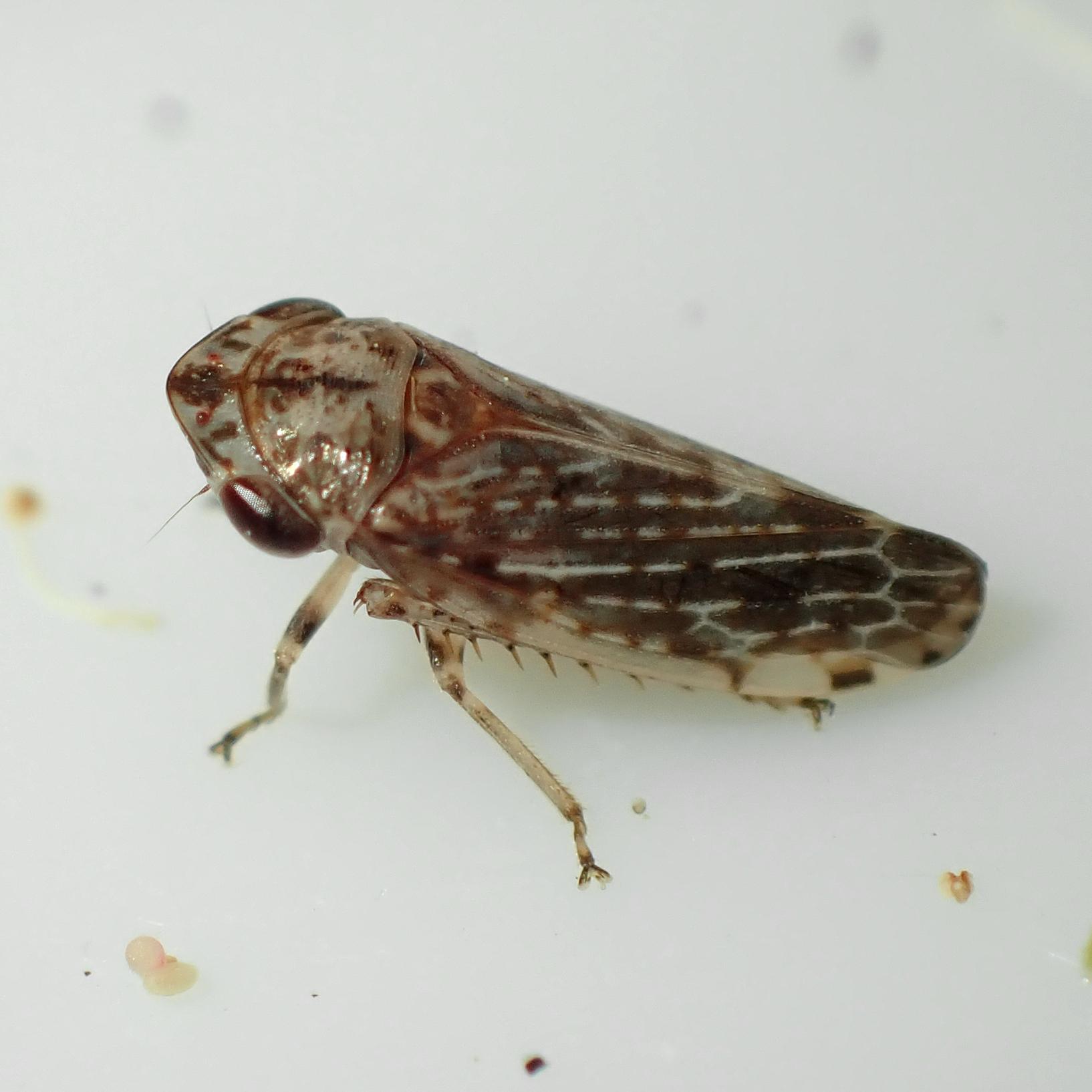
- Novothymbris notata

Scientific classification
- Kingdom: Animalia
- Phylum: Arthropoda
- Class: Insecta
- Order: Hemiptera
- Suborder: Auchenorrhyncha
- Family: Cicadellidae
- Subfamily: Tartessinae
- Genus: Novothymbris; Evans, 1941

Type species
- Diedrocephala zealandica Myers, 1923

= Novothymbris =

Genus of leafhoppers

Novothymbris is a genus of leafhoppers endemic to New Zealand. They are the "dominant" genus of leafhoppers in New Zealand. They are classed in the subfamily Tartessinae, tribe Thymbrini, and the only member of the tribe found outside Australia.

== Species ==
Novothymbris includes the following species, mostly described by J. G. Myers and W. J. Knight:

- Novothymbris cassiniae (Myers, 1923)
- Novothymbris castor Knight, 1974
- Novothymbris cithara Knight, 1974
- Novothymbris extremitatis Knight, 1974
- Novothymbris eylesi Knight, 1974
- Novothymbris hinemoa (Myers, 1923)
- Novothymbris maorica (Myers, 1923)
- Novothymbris notata Knight, 1974
- Novothymbris notialis Knight, 1974
- Novothymbris peregrina Knight, 1974
- Novothymbris pollux Knight, 1974
- Novothymbris punctata Knight, 1974
- Novothymbris solitaria Knight, 1974
- Novothymbris tararua (Myers, 1923)
- Novothymbris vagans Knight, 1974
- Novothymbris zealandica (Myers, 1923)
