= Tharsis quadrangle =

Map of Mars

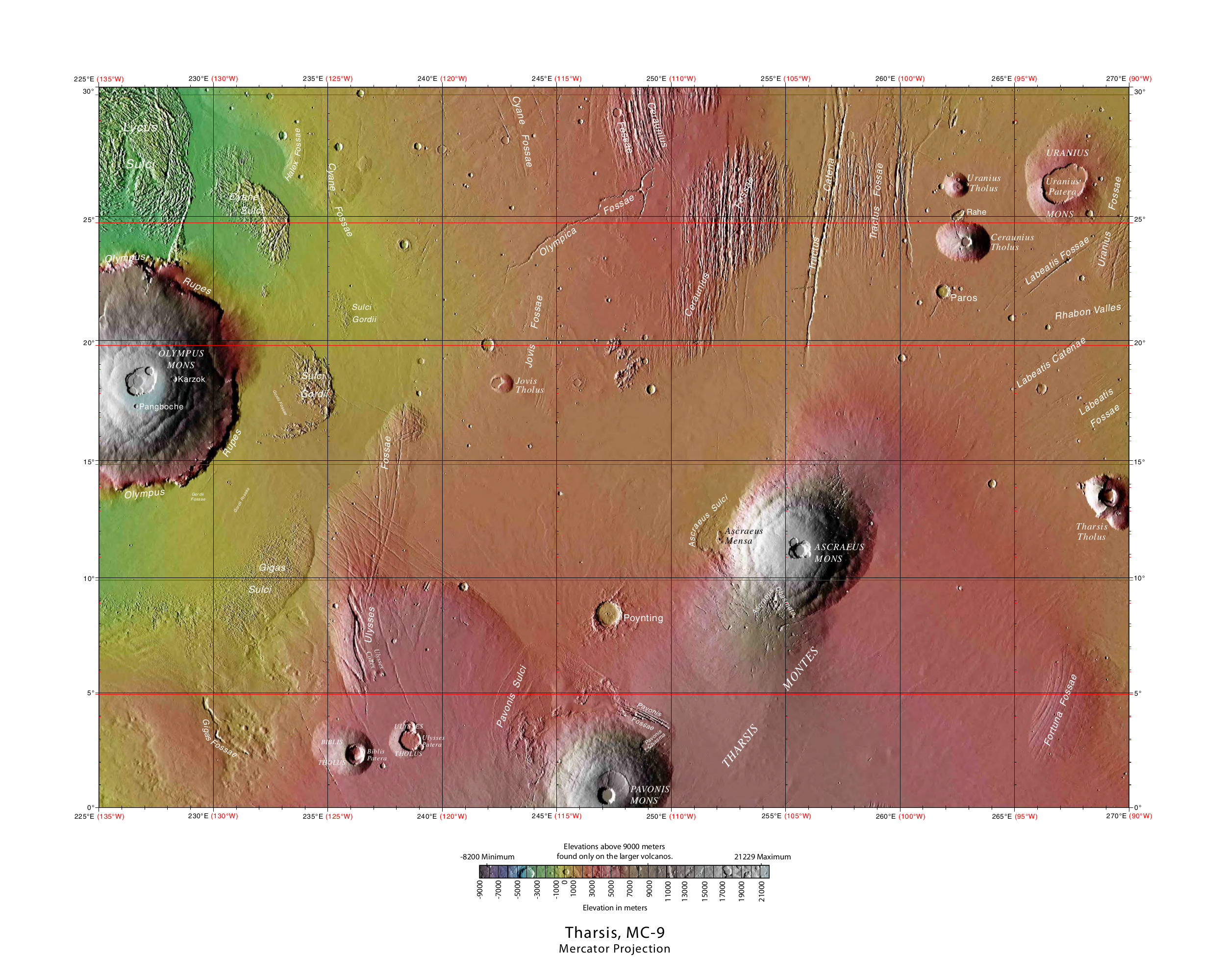
- Map of Tharsis quadrangle from Mars Orbiter Laser Altimeter (MOLA) data. The highest elevations are white and the lowest are blue.
- Coordinates: 15°N 112.5°W

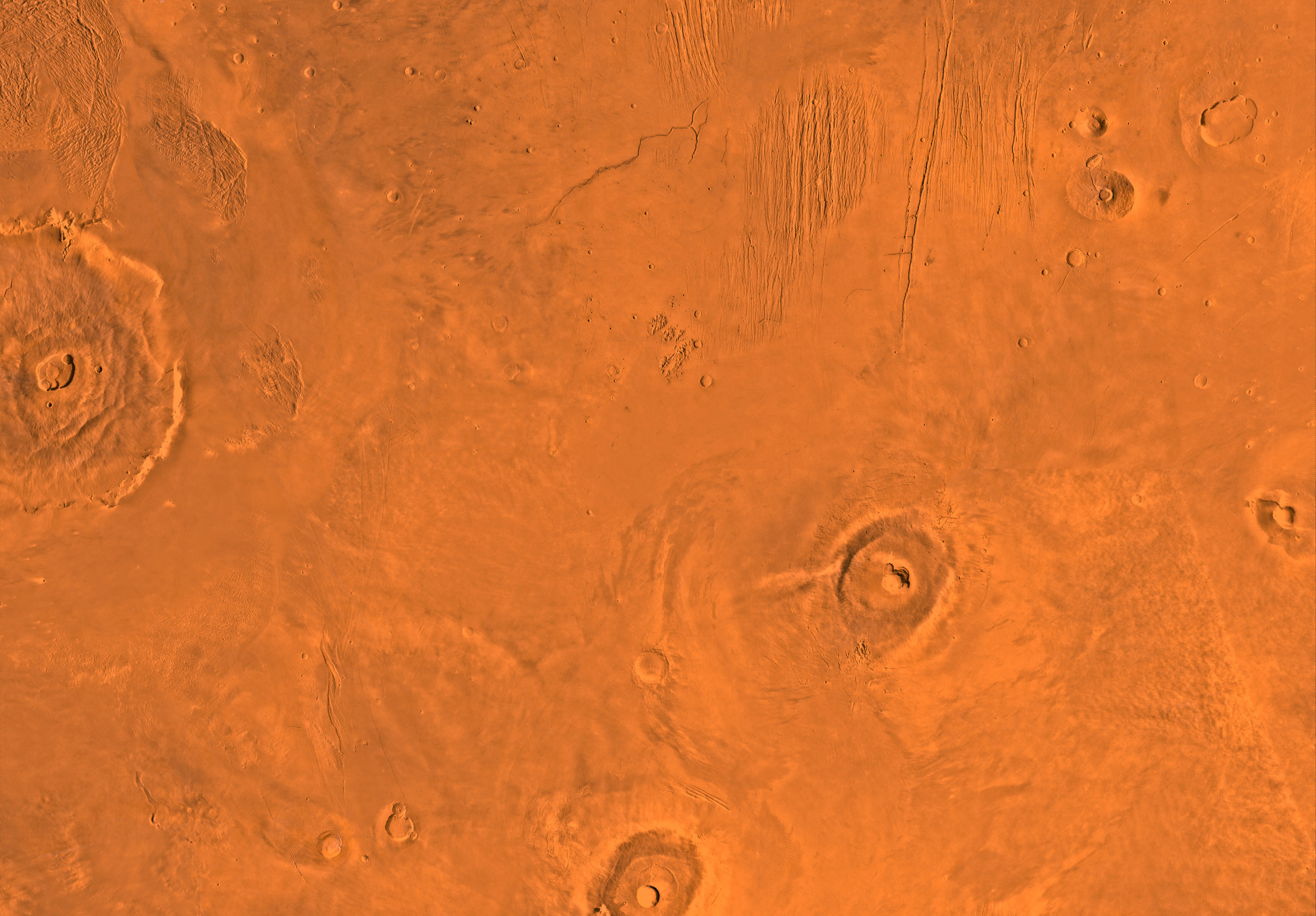
Image of the Tharsis Quadrangle (MC-9). The region contains the Olympus Mons, Ascraeus Mons and Pavonis Mons, three of the four largest shield volcanoes on Mars. The north-central part contains Ceraunius Fossae.

The Tharsis quadrangle is one of a series of 30 quadrangle maps of Mars used by the United States Geological Survey (USGS) Astrogeology Research Program. The Tharsis quadrangle is also referred to as MC-9 (Mars Chart-9). The name Tharsis refers to a land mentioned in the Bible. It may be at the location of the old town of Tartessus at the mouth of Guadalquivir.

The quadrangle covers the area from 90° to 135° west longitude and 0° to 30° north latitude on Mars and contains most of the Tharsis Rise. The plateau is about as high as Earth's Mount Everest and about as big in area as all of Europe. Tharsis contains a group of large volcanoes. Olympus Mons is the tallest.

Within the quadrangle, the two largest impact craters are Poynting and Paros.

== Volcanoes ==
Tharsis is a land of great volcanoes. Olympus Mons is the tallest known volcano in the Solar System; it is 100 times larger than any volcano on Earth. Ascraeus Mons and Pavonis Mons are at least 200 miles across and are over six miles above the plateau that they sit on—and, the plateau is three to four miles above the zero altitude of Mars. Pavonis Mons, the middle in a line of three volcanoes, sits at just about dead center on the equator. Mons is a term used for a large raised feature. Tholus is about the same, but smaller. A patera is flatter and like a volcano with a super large opening. Actually, a patera is formed when the top of a volcano collapses because its magma chamber is empty. Crater Lake Oregon was formed that way. Several volcanoes form a straight line in the Tharsis Uplift. Two major ones are in the Tharsus quadrangle: Ascraeus Mons and Pavonis Mons. It has been proposed that these are the result of plate motion which on Earth makes volcanic arc islands.

Although Mars displays many volcanoes here and other places, there has been no evidence of recent volcanic activity, even at a very low level. Research, published in 2017, found no active release of volcanic gases during two successive Martian years. They looked for the outgassing of sulfur-bearing chemicals with spectrometers.

== Potential influence of volcanic emissions on climate ==
Some scientists maintain that Tharsis has had great influence on the climate of Mars. Volcanoes give off large amounts of gas when they erupt. The gases are usually water vapor and carbon dioxide. Some estimates put the amount of gas released to the atmosphere as enough to make the atmosphere thicker than the Earth's. In addition, the water released by the volcanoes could have been enough to cover all of Mars to a depth of 120 meters. The greenhouse effect of carbon dioxide raises the temperature of a planet by trapping heat in the form of infrared radiation. The volcanic eruptions on Tharsis could have made Mars more Earth-like in the past. Mars may have once had a much thicker and warmer atmosphere. Oceans and/or lakes may have been present.

== Fossae ==
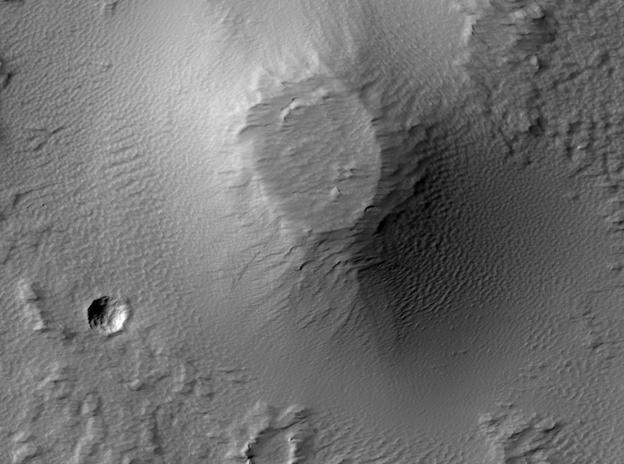
Ulysses Fossae mound, as seen by HiRISE

The Tharsis quadrangle is also home to large troughs (long narrow depressions) called fossae in the geographical language used for Mars. Fossae in this area are Ulysses Fossae, Olympica Fossae, Ceraunius Fossae, and Tractus Fossae. These troughs form when the crust is stretched until it breaks. The stretching can be due to the large weight of a nearby volcano. Studies have shown that the volcanoes of Tharsis caused most of the major fossae on Mars. The stress that caused the fossae and other tectonic features is centered in Noctis Labyrinthus, at 4 S and 253 E. But the center has moved somewhat over time. Fossae/pit craters are common near volcanoes in the Tharsis and Elysium system of volcanoes. A trough often has two breaks with a middle section moving down, leaving steep cliffs along the sides; such a trough is called a graben. Studies have found that on Mars a fault may be as deep as 5 km, that is the break in the rock goes down to 5 km. Moreover, the crack or fault sometimes widens or dilates. This widening causes a void to form with a relatively high volume. When material slides into the void, a pit crater or a pit crater chain forms. Pit craters do not have rims or ejecta around them, like impact craters do. On Mars, individual pit craters can join to form chains or even to form troughs that are sometimes scalloped. Other ideas have been suggested for the formation of fossae and pit craters. There is evidence that they are associated with dikes of magma. Magma might move along, under the surface, breaking the rock and, more importantly, melting ice. The resulting action would cause a crack to form at the surface. Pit craters are not common on Earth. Sinkholes, where the ground falls into a hole (sometimes in the middle of a town) resemble pit craters on Mars. However, on the Earth these holes are caused by limestone being dissolved thereby causing a void.

Knowledge of the locations and formation mechanisms of pit craters and fossae is important for the future colonization of Mars because they may be reservoirs of water.

== Glaciers ==
Some scientists see evidence that glaciers exist on many of the volcanoes in Tharsis, including Olympus Mons, Ascraeus Mons, and Pavonis Mons. Ceraunius Tholus may have even had its glaciers melt to form some temporary lakes in the past.

== Ice sheets ==
Tharsis may have been the location for a giant ice sheet. It would have been in the Late Hesperian time period. It may have melted quickly due to events like volcanism or impacts and it could have contributed to a northern ocean. Some researchers have suggested that lava flows covered the ice cap, thereby causing it to melt rather quickly. The water could have created the outflow channels around Tharsis.

== Dark slope streaks ==
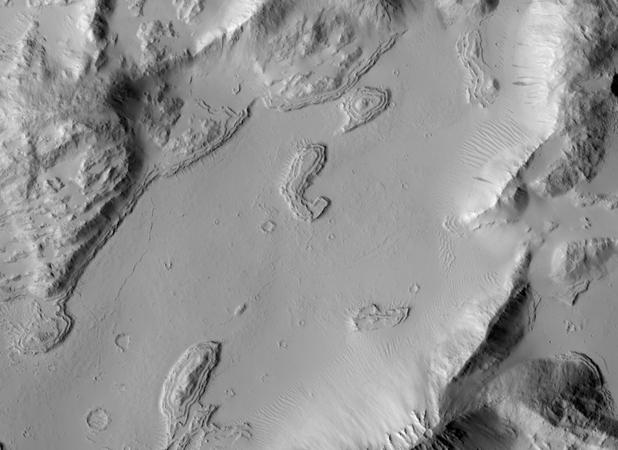
Sulci Gordii Terraced Hills, as seen by HiRISE. Many dark slope streaks are visible.

Some pictures below show dark streaks: on the slopes on large blocks just to the left of Tharsis Tholus, on Ceraunius Fossae, and on Olympica Fossae. Such streaks are common on Mars. They occur on steep slopes of craters, troughs, and valleys. The streaks are dark at first. They get lighter with age. Sometimes they start in a tiny spot, then spread out and go for hundreds of meters. They have been seen to travel around obstacles, like boulders. It is believed that they are avalanches of bright dust that expose a darker underlying layer. However, several ideas have been advanced to explain them. Some involve water or even the growth of organisms. The streaks appear in areas covered with dust. Much of the Martian surface is covered with dust. Fine dust settles out of the atmosphere covering everything. We know a lot about it because the solar panels of the Mars Rovers get covered with it, thus reducing the electrical energy. The power of the Rovers has been restored many times by the wind, in the form of dust devils, clearing the panels and thus boosting the power. Dust storms are frequent, especially when the spring season begins in the southern hemisphere. At that time, Mars is 40% closer to the Sun. The orbit of Mars is much more elliptical than the Earth's. That is the difference between the farthest point from the Sun and the closest point to the Sun is very great for Mars, but only a slight amount for the Earth. Also, every few years, the entire planet is engulfed in global dust storms. When NASA's Mariner 9 craft arrived there, nothing could be seen through the dust storm. Other global dust storms have also been observed, since that time.

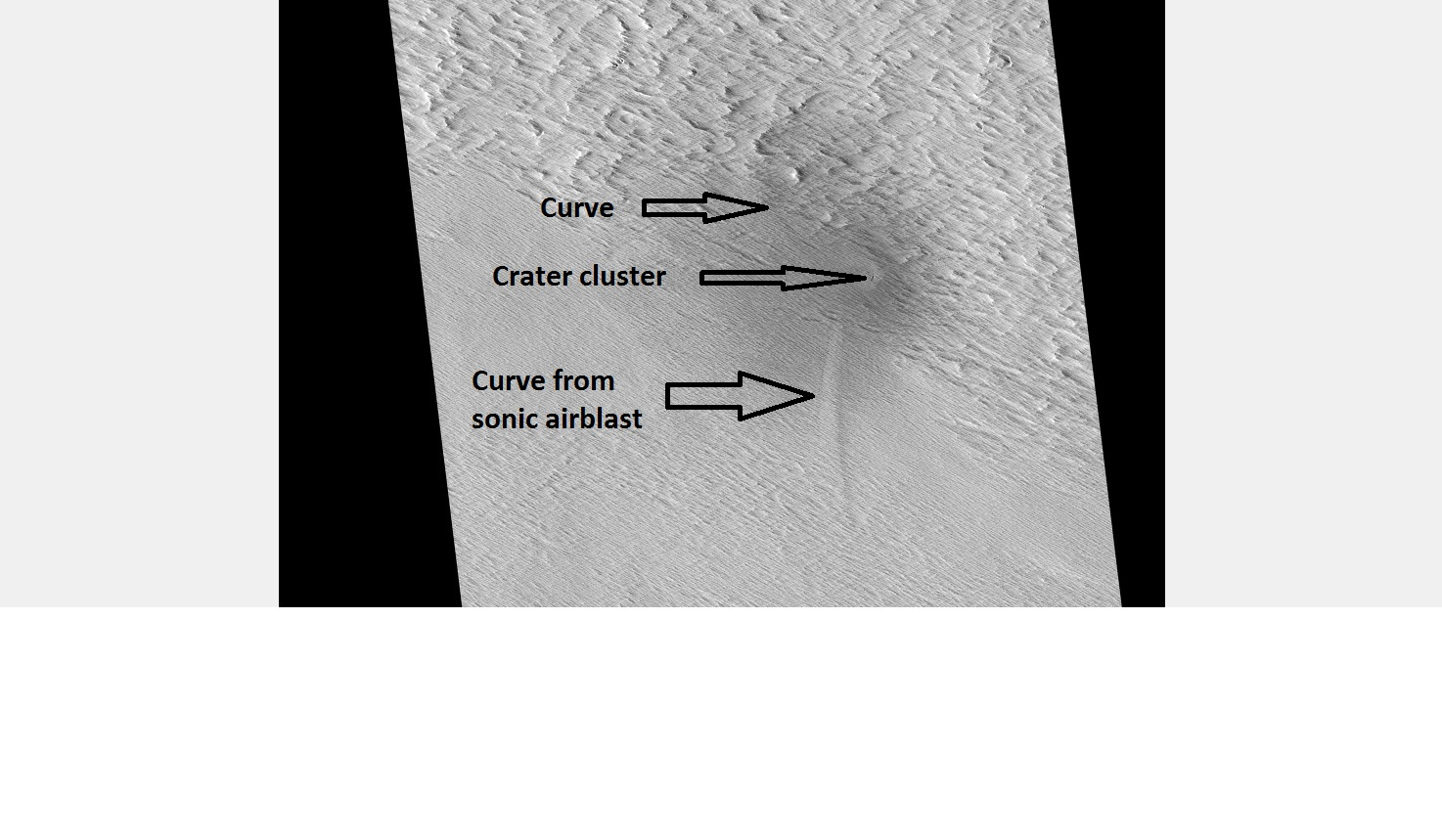
Image indicates crater cluster and curved lines formed by airblast from meteorites. Meteorites caused airblast which caused dust avalanches on steep slopes. Image is from HiRISE.

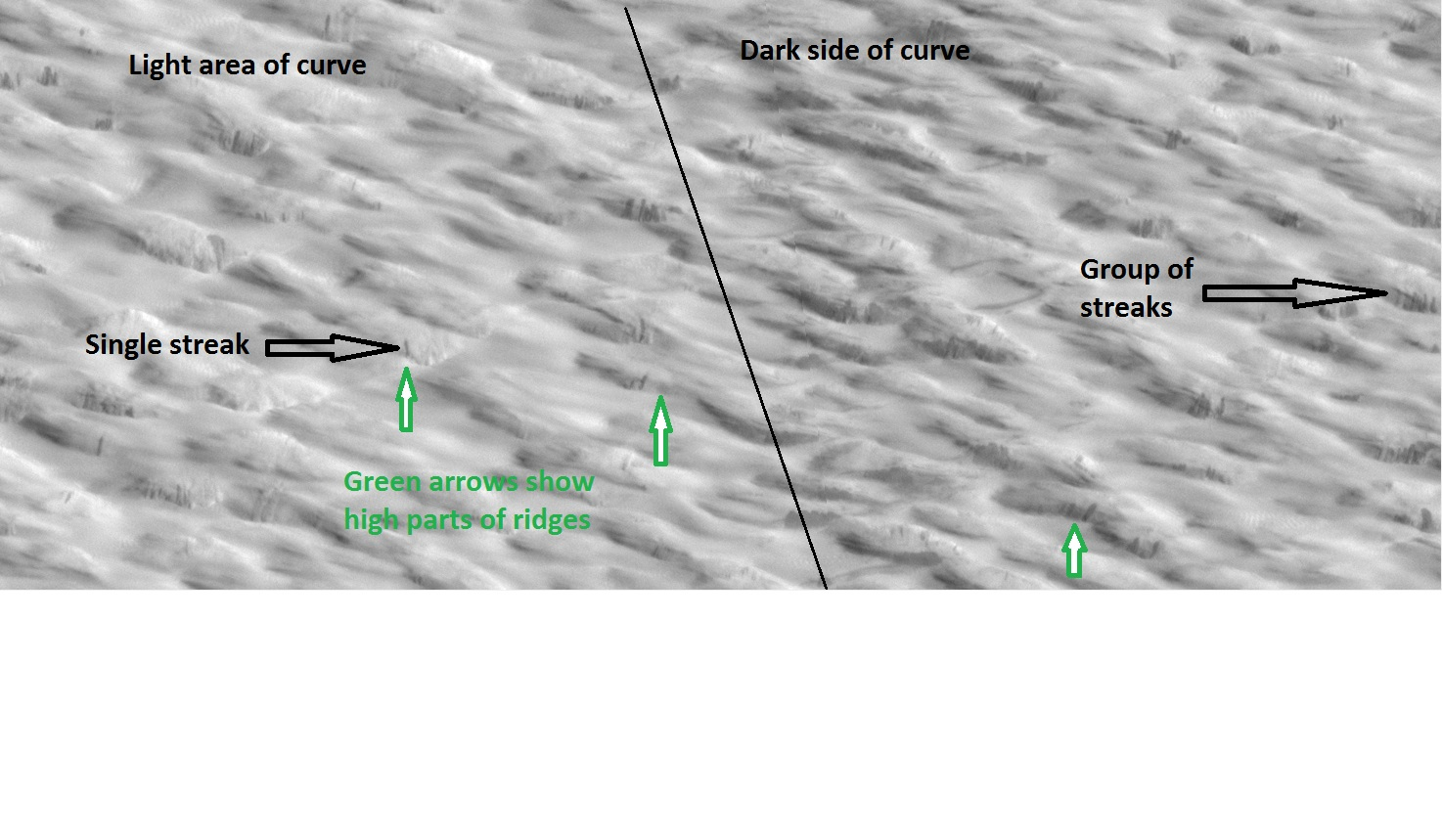
Close-up of previous image along light/dark boundary. Dark line in middle of image shows border between light and dark area of curved lines. Green arrows show high areas of ridges. Loose dust moved down steep slopes when it felt the airblast from meteorite strikes. Image is from HiRISE.

Research, published in January 2012 in Icarus, found that dark streaks were initiated by airblasts from meteorites traveling at supersonic speeds. The team of scientists was led by Kaylan Burleigh, an undergraduate at the University of Arizona. After counting some 65,000 dark streaks around the impact site of a group of five new craters, patterns emerged. The number of streaks was greatest closer to the impact site. So, the impact somehow probably caused the streaks. Also, the distribution of the streaks formed a pattern with two wings extending from the impact site. The curved wings resembled scimitars, curved knives. This pattern suggests that an interaction of airblasts from the group of meteorites shook dust loose enough to start dust avalanches that formed the many dark streaks. At first it was thought that the shaking of the ground from the impact caused the dust avalanches, but if that was the case the dark streaks would have been arranged symmetrically around the impacts, rather than being concentrated into curved shapes.

The crater cluster lies near the equator 510 miles) south of Olympus Mons, on a type of terrain called the Medusae Fossae formation. The formation is coated with dust and contains wind-carved ridges called yardangs. These yardangs have steep slopes thickly covered with dust, so when the sonic boom of the airblast arrived from the impacts dust started to move down the slope. Using photos from Mars Global Surveyor and HiRISE camera on NASA's Mars Reconnaissance Orbiter, scientists have found about 20 new impacts each year on Mars. Because the spacecraft have been imaging Mars almost continuously for a span of 14 years, newer images with suspected recent craters can be compared to older images to determine when the craters were formed. Since the craters were spotted in a HiRISE image from February 2006, but were not present in a Mars Global Surveyor image taken in May 2004, the impact occurred in that time frame.

The largest crater in the cluster is about 22 meters (72 feet) in diameter with close to the area of a basketball court. As the meteorite traveled through the Martian atmosphere it probably broke up; hence a tight group of impact craters resulted. Dark slope streaks have been seen for some time, and many ideas have been advanced to explain them.

== See also ==
- Climate of Mars
- Dark slope streaks
- Fossa (geology)
- Geology of Mars
- Glacier
- Glaciers on Mars
- HiRISE
- List of mountains on Mars
- List of quadrangles on Mars
- Rahe (crater)
- Tholus
- True polar wander on Mars
- Volcano
- Volcanology of Mars
- Water on Mars

MC-01 Mare Boreum (features)
MC-02 Diacria (features)		MC-03 Arcadia (features)	MC-04 Acidalium (features)	MC-05 Ismenius Lacus (features)		MC-06 Casius (features)	MC-07 Cebrenia (features)
MC-08 Amazonis (features)	MC-09 Tharsis (features)	MC-10 Lunae Palus (features)	MC-11 Oxia Palus (features)	MC-12 Arabia (features)	MC-13 Syrtis Major (features)	MC-14 Amenthes (features)	MC-15 Elysium (features)
MC-16 Memnonia (features)	MC-17 Phoenicis Lacus (features)	MC-18 Coprates (features)	MC-19 Margaritifer Sinus (features)	MC-20 Sinus Sabaeus (features)	MC-21 Iapygia (features)	MC-22 Mare Tyrrhenum (features)	MC-23 Aeolis (features)
MC-24 Phaethontis (features)		MC-25 Thaumasia (features)	MC-26 Argyre (features)	MC-27 Noachis (features)		MC-28 Hellas (features)	MC-29 Eridania (features)
MC-30 Mare Australe (features)
