= Tharsis Tholus =

Martian volcano

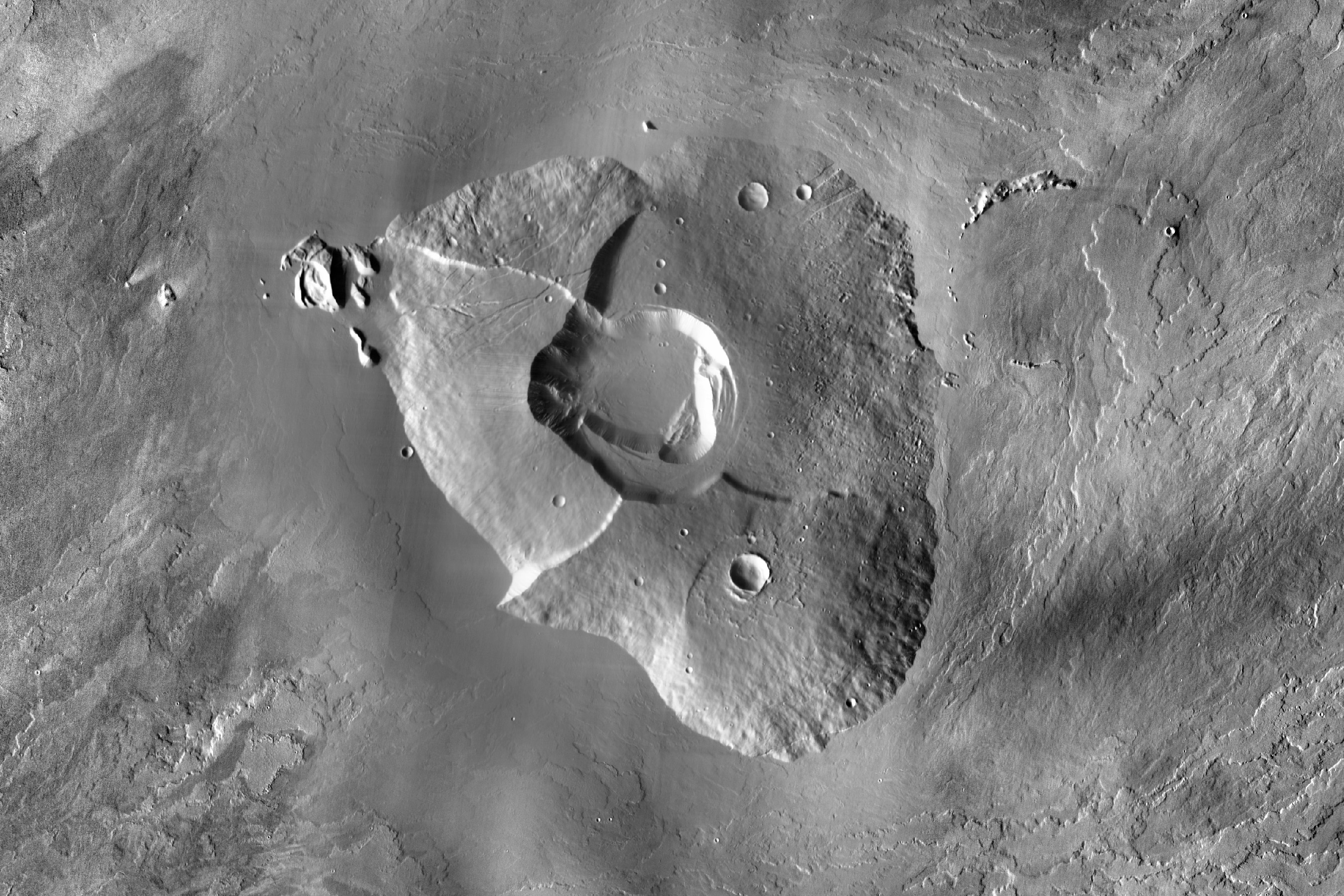
- THEMIS daytime IR mosaic of Tharsis Tholus. The western and eastern flanks of the volcano have been sites of large-scale flank collapse events. An irregular caldera is present in the center.
- Feature type: Shield volcano
- Location: Tharsis quadrangle
- Coordinates: 13.25°N 90.69°W
- Peak: 9 km above datum
- Discoverer: Mariner 9

Tharsis Tholus is an intermediate-sized shield volcano located in the eastern Tharsis region of the planet Mars. The volcano was discovered by the Mariner 9 spacecraft in 1972 and originally given the informal name Volcano 7. In 1973, the International Astronomical Union (IAU) officially designated it Tharsis Tholus. In planetary geology, tholus (pl. tholi) is the term for a small domical mountain, usually a volcano.

== General Description ==
Map of Tharsis quadrangle. Tharsis Tholus is on the far right.

Tharsis Tholus lies on the eastern edge of the Tharsis quadrangle at 13.5°N, 91°W. It is about 800 km east-northeast of Ascraeus Mons, the northernmost of the large Tharsis Montes volcanoes. Lava from the Tharsis Montes and other sources within the interior of Tharsis completely surrounds Tharsis Tholus, forming a broad volcanic plain at the volcano's base. (Note: Plescia, 2003, p. 224) Tharsis Tholus measures 155 km x 125 km. It is distinctly bulbous in appearance, and is unique among Martian volcanoes in the degree to which it has been modified by faulting. Large normal faults cut across and completely penetrate the volcano, dividing the edifice into several major blocks, or sectors. The volcano has an elongated central caldera (collapse crater) measuring 36.7 × 38.9 km and about 3 km deep.

In profile, Tharsis Tholus is dome-shaped (convex upward), with flank slopes ranging from less than 1° near the summit to up to 16° at the base. The average flank slope is 10°, making it one of the steepest volcanoes on Mars. The volcano rises to an elevation of about 9 km (5.6 mi). The base of the volcano is buried by young (Amazonian-aged) lava flows presumably from the Tharsis Montes, so the true size of the edifice cannot be accurately determined. Estimates of the thickness of lava burying the base of Tharsis Tholus range from 500 m to 3.5 km.

Most of the volcano's surface is mantled with a thick layer of fine dust or ash, giving the volcano's flanks a smooth to slightly hummocky appearance. The mantle material obscures the underlying bedrock except in areas with steep slopes, such as along the caldera's upper walls. Landslide debris from the caldera's western and southeastern wall is present on the floor of the caldera.

== Geology ==
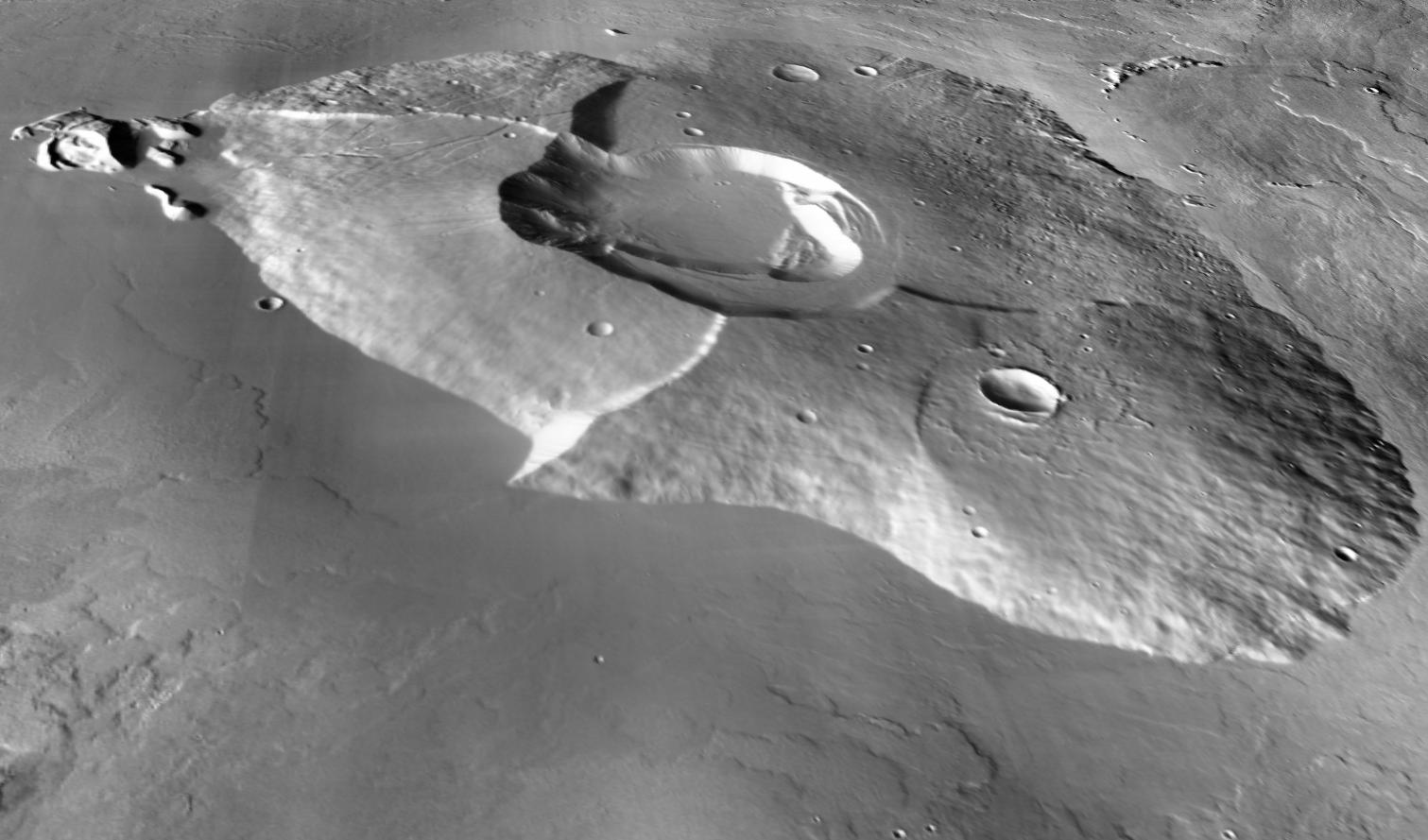
Oblique view of Tharsis Tholus looking northeast. Note the down-dropped block on western flank bounded by normal faults. A large debris avalanche deposit (DAD) is present at upper left. Narrow NE-trending grabens cross the volcano. Large lava flows from Tharsis are visible in lower left and upper right. Image is THEMIS daytime IR mosaic overlain on MOLA.

The volcano's relatively steep slopes and dome-like shape led some early researchers to conclude that the volcano is built from viscous, silicic lavas or pyroclastics, rather than fluid basalts. However, more recent studies based on data from the Mars Odyssey, Mars Express, and Mars Reconnaissance Orbiter (MRO) spacecraft indicate that Tharsis Tholus is probably a basaltic shield (Note: Plescia, 2003, p. 223) or a shield with a stratocone component. CRISM data from MRO show that lava exposed on the caldera scarp is composed of high- and low-calcium pyroxenes. Olivine is present in abundance on the west flank of the volcano, but it appears to be present only in the dust that mantles the volcano. No phyllosilicates (clay minerals), sulfates, or iron oxides have been detected.

Tharsis Tholus has a complex volcano-tectonic history. The edifice has been modified by at least four distinct episodes of structural deformation. The most prominent area of deformation is the central caldera complex, which consists of an outer, older caldera and an inner, younger one. (Note: Plescia, 2003, p. 229) The calderas are bordered by a well-preserved system of concentric normal faults and peripheral ring faults. A third, barely visible, caldera is present on the volcano's southern flank. Much of that caldera's rim is buried by ejecta from a young impact crater; however, the caldera's presence is outlined by an almost level circular area about 45 km in diameter.

A system of large, arcuate normal faults lie radial to the volcano's center. The normal faults have large offsets and transect the volcano into at least four sectors. The north and south sectors have smooth, convex upward profiles. The western and eastern sectors of the volcano consist of huge, down-dropped blocks. A large debris avalanche deposit (DAD) is present at the northwestern edge of the western block. The DAD appears to be made up of coherent slabs of flank material originating from the down-dropped western flank. Some researchers have compared the deformation on the flanks of Tharsis Tholus to "sector collapse" observed at Mauna Loa in Hawaii and other terrestrial volcanoes. Sector collapse is a sudden, catastrophic detachment of a volcano's flank caused by lateral spreading of the volcano. Another suggested terrestrial analog for Tharsis Tholus is the Maderas Volcano in Nicaragua. (Note: Plescia, 2003, p. 235)

In addition to the normal faults, a system of narrow, parallel grabens cut across large parts of the volcano. The grabens strike to the northeast and range in width from 0.5 to 2.8 km. Chains of pits craters associated with the grabens are also observed. (Note: Plescia, 2003, p. 228) The age relationship between the grabens and normal faults is complex. In places, the grabens appear to crosscut the normal faults, indicating that the grabens are younger. However, the strikes of the normal faults locally appear to have a strong northeast influence, suggesting that the stresses that formed the grabens predate the normal faults. It is likely that the grabens developed repeatedly over an extended period of time (Note: Plescia, 2003, p. 232) and may be partly contemporaneous with the normal faults.

The presence of two calderas suggests that two separate magma chambers underlie the volcano. In addition, a fissure-type eruption that formed a small stratocone is present near the south flank of the main volcano. Thus, Tharsis Tholus may be the result of two volcanoes growing together, with the main one taking up the northern two thirds of the structure.

== Age ==
Crater counting shows that the oldest parts of Tharsis Tholus formed around 3.82 billion years ago (Gya) in the late Noachian Period. The western flank seems to be about 3.73 Gya, and the east flank shows an age of about 1.08 Gya (Middle Amazonian Period). A fissure eruption on the south flank produced a lava flow around 196 million years ago (Late Amazonian Period). Volcanic activity thus covers more than 3.6 billion years of Mars history. The fissure-type eruption at the south flank of Tharsis Tholus is relatively young, so it may indicate that future volcanic activity is still possible at the mountain.

== Gallery ==
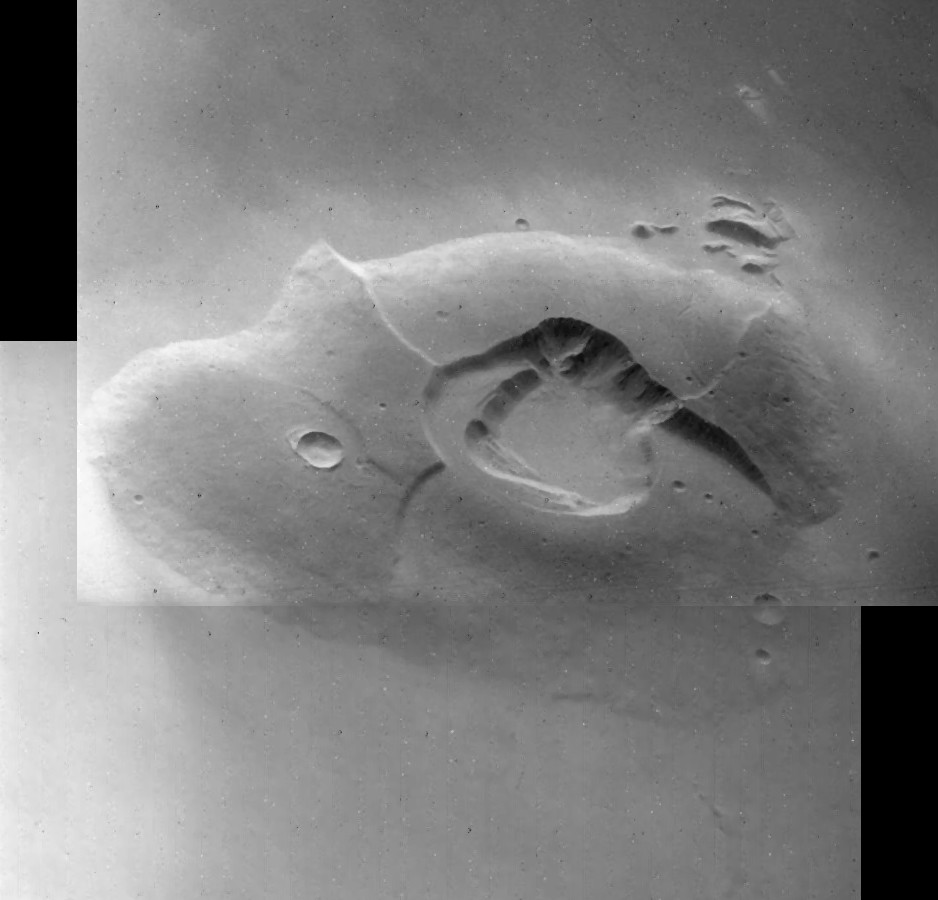
Viking 1 orbiter image of Tharsis Tholus (1977).

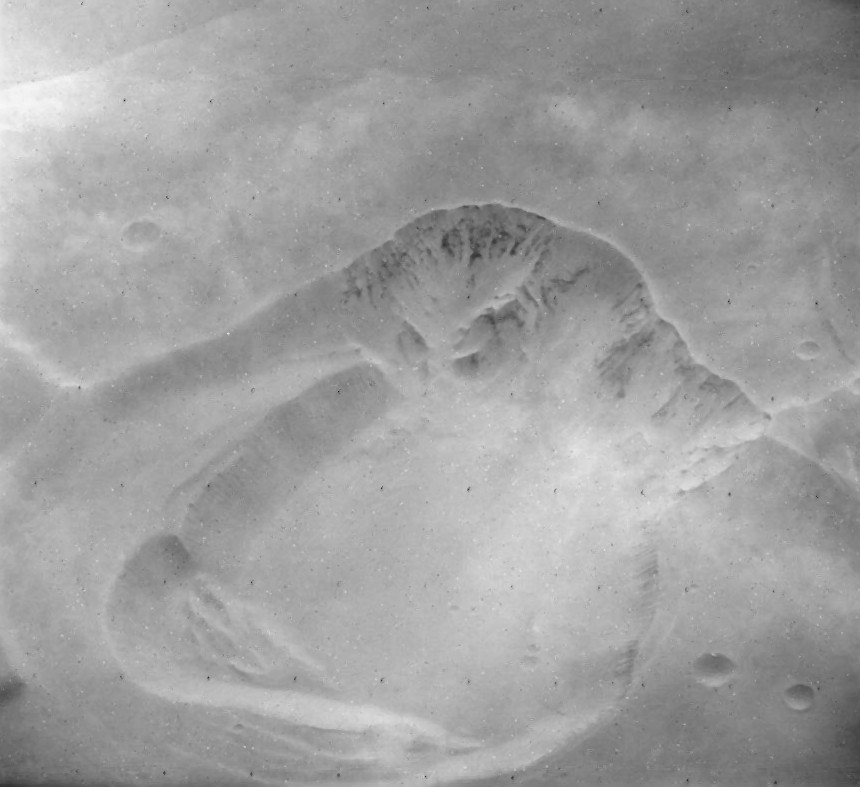
Viking image of summit caldera of Tharsis Tholus.

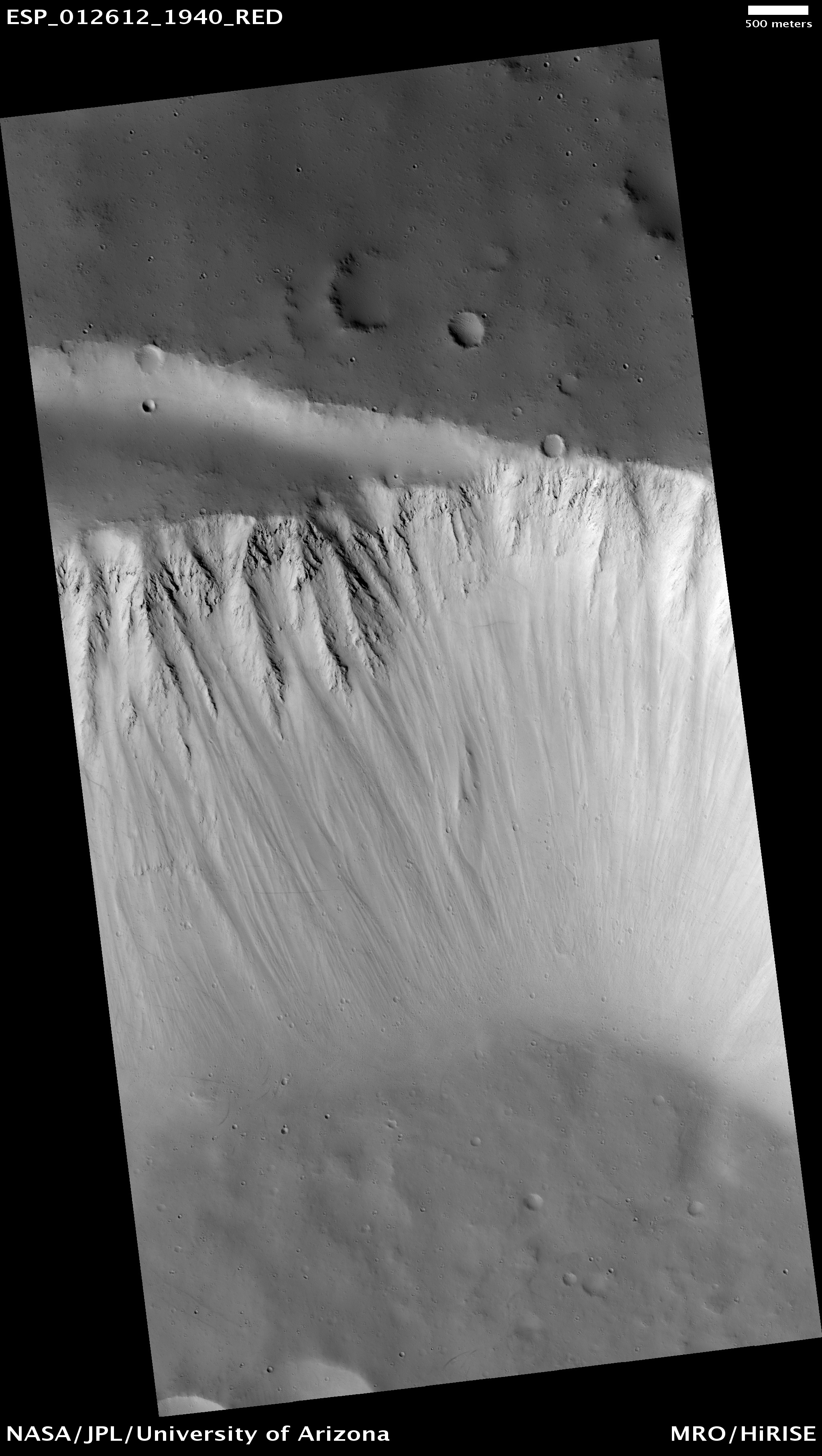
HiRISE image of the northwestern wall of Tharsis Tholus caldera. Note the outcrops of bedrock at top.

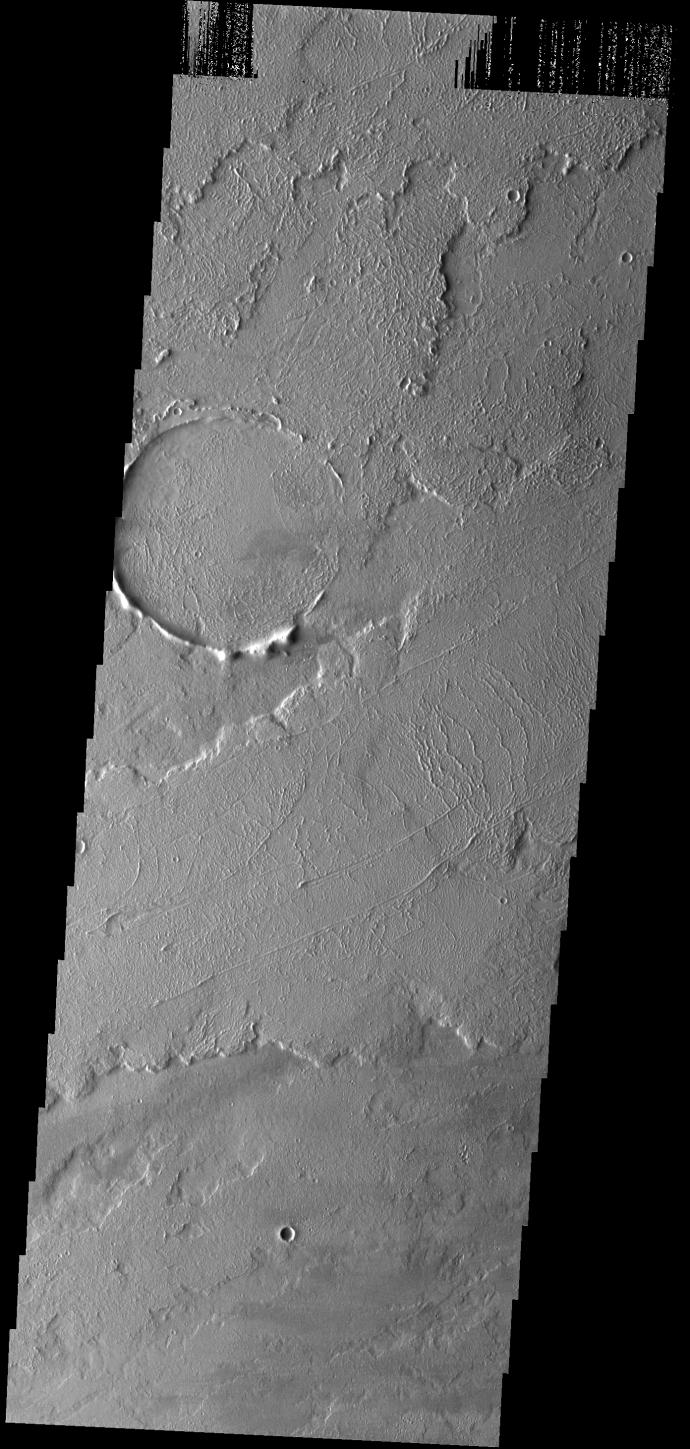
THEMIS image of lava flow plains northeast of Tharsis Tholus. The volcano is surrounded by these Amazonian-aged lava flows from the interior of the Tharsis region to the west.

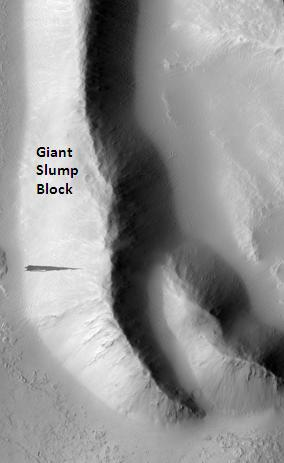
HiRISE image of large slump block or debris avalanche deposit (DAD) at northwest edge of Tharsis Tholus (just off to right). Note the dark slope streak located in the middle left of this picture.

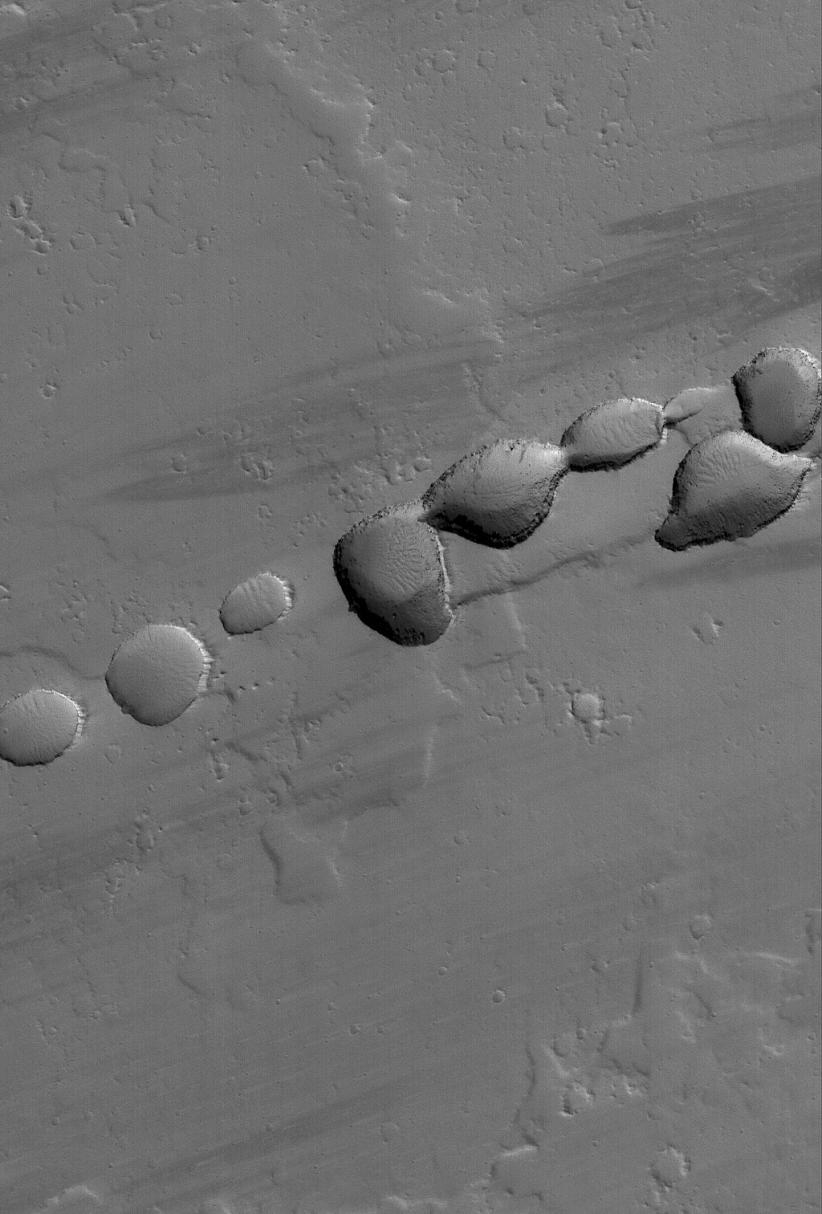
Mars Global Surveyor image of pit crater chain northwest of Tharsis Tholus.
