= Sulci Gordii =

Sulci on Mars

- Sulci Gordii, as seen by THEMIS.
- Coordinates: 18.9°N 125.5°W

Sulci Gordii in the feature in the Tharsis quadrangle of Mars. The term "sulci" is applied to subparallel furrows and ridges. It is located at 18.9° north latitude and 125.5° west longitude. It is 400 km long and was named after a classical albedo feature name.
