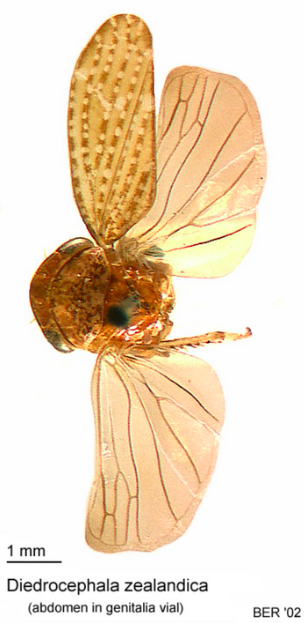

Scientific classification
- Kingdom: Animalia
- Phylum: Arthropoda
- Clade: Pancrustacea
- Class: Insecta
- Order: Hemiptera
- Suborder: Auchenorrhyncha
- Family: Cicadellidae
- Genus: Novothymbris
- Species: N. zealandica

Binomial name
- Novothymbris zealandica (Myers, 1923)

= Novothymbris zealandica =

Species of leafhopper

Novothymbris zealandica is a species of leafhopper endemic to New Zealand.

== Taxonomy ==
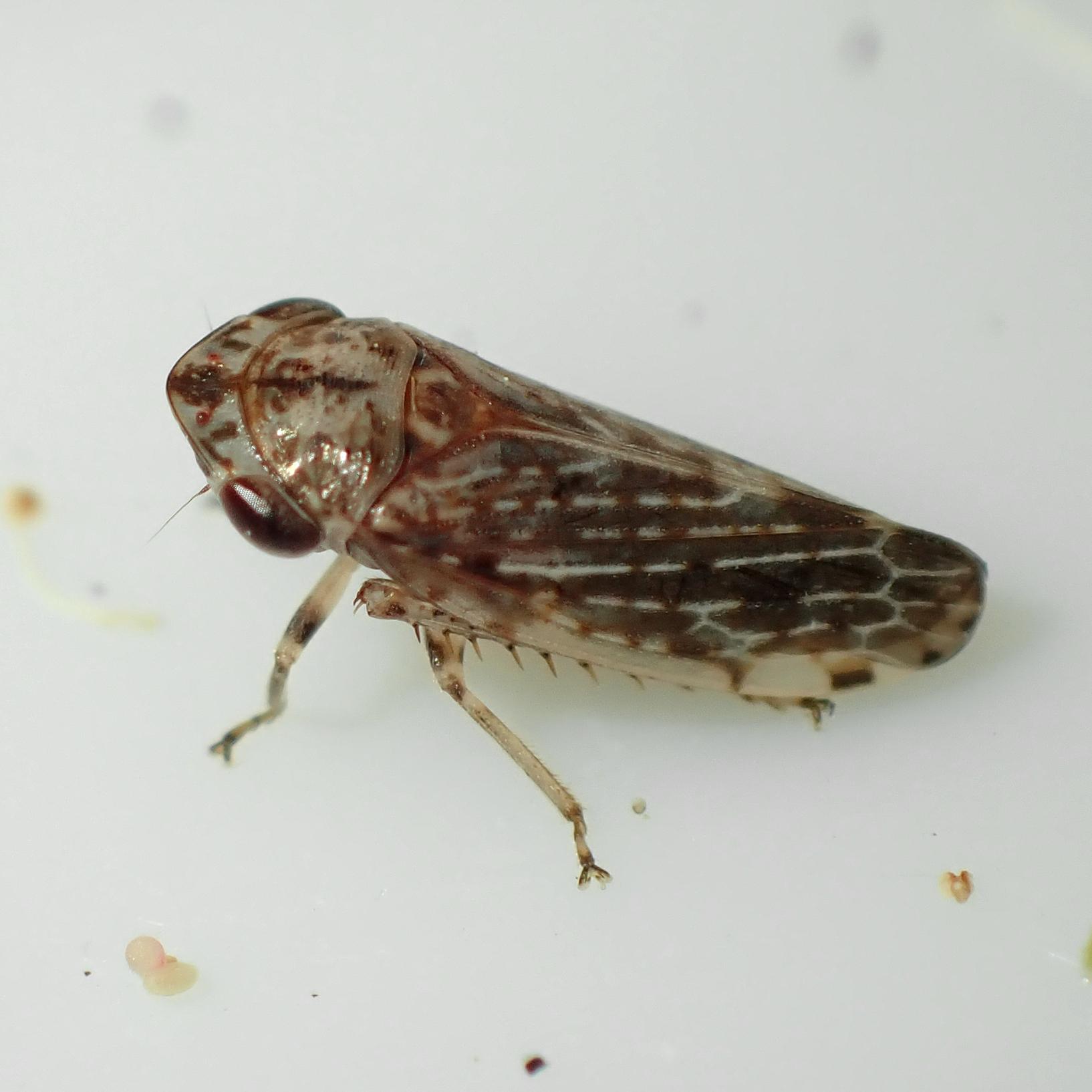
Novothymbris notata is a related species also in the zelandica group.

Novothymbris zealandica is by original designation the type species of the genus Novothymbris. It was first scientifically described under the name Diedrocephala zealandica by Myers in 1923. The type specimen was collected from Dun Mountain, Nelson, and is stored in the New Zealand Arthropod Collection as of 2010.N. zealandica is part of the eponymous zelandica group of Novothymbris species.

== Description ==
Novothymbris zealandica has an elongated body compared to related species. The leafhoppers are palely-coloured of straw or ivory. The males measure between 4.88 and 5.98 millimetres (0.192 and 0.235 in) long, while the females are larger, from 5.68 to 6.34 millimetres (0.224 to 0.250 in) long. The vertex is coloured in patches with brown and occasionally pink; in males it is distinctively broad and short.

== Distribution and habitat ==
Members of the genus Novothymbris are found on trees and bushes.N. zealandica is generally found in lowland to montane elevations. They are phloem-feeders most active during the New Zealand summer, from October to April. N. zealandica has been observed on Corokia, Kunzea, Nothofagus, Olearia, and Podocarpus. The species is widely distributed in New Zealand, being found in a patchy distribution from Stewart Island to Northland, mainly in central and western regions. It is the most widespread Novothymbris species.
