= Olympica Fossae =

Geological formation on Mars

- Image of the Olympica Fosae based on THEMIS day-time image
- Coordinates: 25°N 114.1°W

Map of Tharsis quadrangle with major features indicated. Tharsis contains many volcanoes, including Olympus Mons, the tallest known volcano in the Solar System. Notice Ceraunius Tholus, although it looks small, it is about as high as Earth's Mount Everest.

The Olympica Fossae are a set of troughs in the Tharsis quadrangle of Mars at 25° north latitude and 114.1° west longitude. They are about 420 km long and were named after an albedo feature at 17N, 134W. Parts of the fossae have been suggested to be both outflow channels as well as channels for flowing lava, routing both molten rock and catastrophic outburst floods of water at different times in Mars' geological past.

== Fossa ==
The Olympica Fossae are a large set of troughs, called fossae in the geographical language used for Mars. Troughs form when the crust is stretched until it breaks along two subparallel failure planes, or faults. The middle section between the faults moves down, forming the trough and leaving steep cliffs along the sides. Sometimes, a line of pits form as material collapse into a void that forms from the stretching. Such fault-bounded geological structures are also called graben.

== Dark slope streaks ==
A picture below shows dark streaks on the Olympica Fossae. Such streaks are common on Mars. They occur on steep slopes of craters, troughs, and valleys. The streaks are dark at first. They get lighter with age. Sometimes they start in a tiny spot, then spread out and go for hundreds of meters. They have been seen to travel around obstacles, like boulders. It is believed that they are avalanches of bright dust that expose a darker underlying layer. However, several ideas have been advanced to explain them. Some involve water or even the growth of organisms. The streaks appear in areas covered with dust. Much of the Martian surface is covered with dust. Fine dust settles out of the atmosphere covering everything. We know a lot about this dust because the solar panels of the Mars Rovers get covered with dust, thus reducing the electrical energy. The power of the Rovers has been restored many times by the wind, in the form of dust devils, cleaning the panels and boosting the power. Dust storms are frequent, especially when the spring season begins in the southern hemisphere. At that time, Mars is 40% closer to the Sun. The orbit of Mars is much more elliptical than the Earth's. That is the difference between the farthest point from the Sun and the closest point to the Sun is very great for Mars, but only a slight amount for the Earth. Also, every few years, the entire planet is engulfed in global dust storms. When NASA's Mariner 9 craft arrived there, nothing could be seen through the dust storm. Other global dust storms have also been observed, since that time.

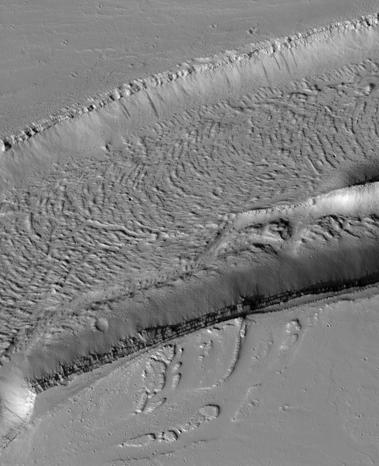
The Olympica Fossae, as seen by HiRISE. Click on image to see rock layers in wall.

== See also ==
- Dark slope streaks
- Fossa (geology)
- HiRISE
- Mars Global Surveyor
