= Tractus Fossae =

Troughs on Mars

- Tractus Fossae based on THEMIS day-time image
- Coordinates: 26°N 101.4°W
- Naming: a classical albedo feature name

The Tractus Fossae are a set of troughs in the Tharsis quadrangle of Mars, located at 26° north latitude and 101.4° west longitude. They are 390 km (240 mi) long and are named after a classical albedo feature name. The term "fossae" is used to indicate large troughs when using geographical terminology related to Mars. Troughs, sometimes also called grabens, form when the crust is stretched until it breaks, which forms two breaks with a middle section moving down, leaving steep cliffs along the sides. Sometimes, a line of pits form as materials collapse into a void that forms from the stretching.

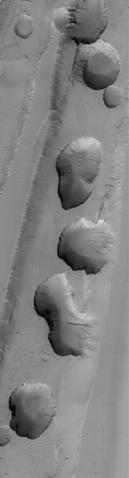
Trough within the Tractus Fossae caused by faults and resulting collapse of material into faults forming a chain of pits, as seen by Mars Global Surveyor.

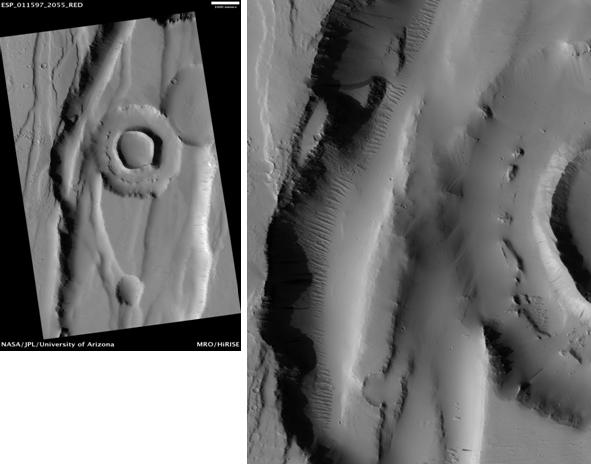
Tractus Fossae ringed pit, as seen by HiRISE. Scale bar is 1000 meters long.

== See also ==
- Fossa (geology)
- Geology of Mars
- HiRISE
