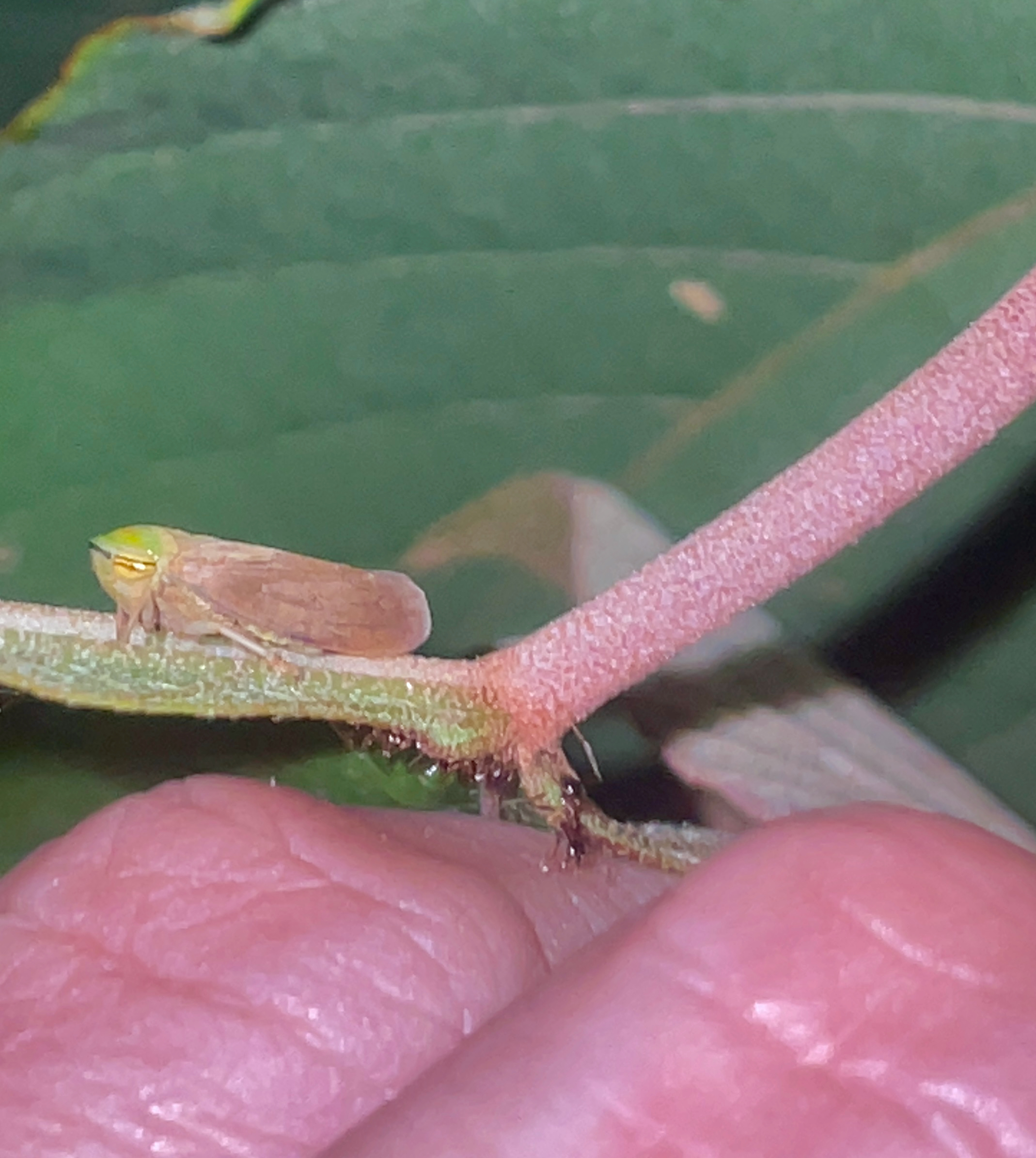
- Tartessus ferrugineus

Scientific classification
- Kingdom: Animalia
- Phylum: Arthropoda
- Clade: Pancrustacea
- Class: Insecta
- Order: Hemiptera
- Suborder: Auchenorrhyncha
- Family: Cicadellidae
- Subfamily: Tartessinae
- Genus: Tartessus; Stål, 1865

Synonyms
- Tartesus [sic] Stål, 1865

= Tartessus =

Genus of true bugs

Tartessus is the type genus of Asian leafhoppers in the tribe Tartessini and subfamily Tartessinae; it was erected by Carl Stål in 1865.

== Species ==
The World Auchenorrhyncha Database includes:

1. Tartessus cristatus Linnavuori, 1960
2. Tartessus ferrugineus (Walker, 1851)
3. Tartessus fieberi Stål, 1865
4. Tartessus flavifrons Schmidt, 1920
5. Tartessus fulvescens Jacobi, 1941
6. Tartessus gokaensis Shiraki, 1913
7. Tartessus guttatinervis Jacobi, 1941
8. Tartessus iridescens Gnezdilov, 2020
9. Tartessus kabakovi Gnezdilov, 2020
10. Tartessus malayus (Stål, 1859) – type species (as Bythoscopus malayus Stål, 1859)
11. Tartessus nigrinervis Schmidt, 1926
12. Tartessus nigriventris Gnezdilov, 2020
13. Tartessus obscurus Schmidt, 1920
14. Tartessus ochraceus Metcalf, 1946
15. Tartessus perobscurus Jacobi, 1941
16. Tartessus plebejus Spångberg, 1878
17. Tartessus swezeyi Metcalf, 1946
18. Tartessus uniformis Spångberg, 1878
