= Ascraeus Mons =

Martian volcano

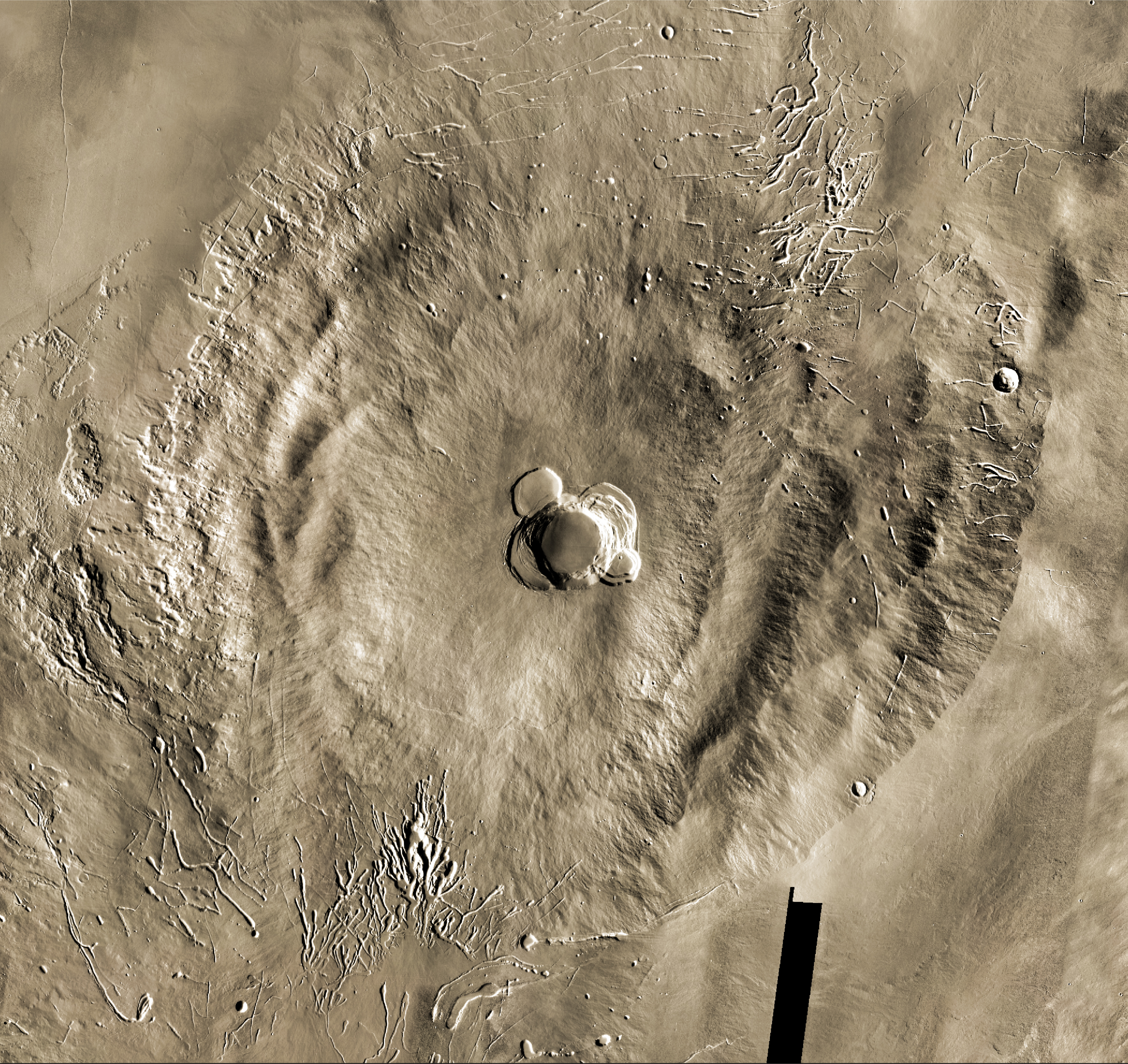
- Feature type: Shield volcano
- Location: Central Tharsis Rise, Mars
- Coordinates: 11.92°N 255.92°E
- Peak: 15 km (9.3 mi) 49,000 ft (15,000 m) local relief; 18.2 km (11.3 mi) above datum
- Discoverer: Mariner 9
- Eponym: Latin – Ascraeus Mountain

Ascraeus Mons /əˈskriːəs ˈmɒnz/ is a large shield volcano located in the Tharsis region of the planet Mars. It is the northernmost and tallest of three shield volcanoes collectively known as the Tharsis Montes.

== Discovery ==
The volcano's location corresponds to the classical albedo feature Ascraeus Lacus.

Ascraeus Mons was discovered by the Mariner 9 spacecraft in 1971. The volcano was originally called North Spot because it was the northernmost of only four spots visible on the surface due to a global dust storm that was then enshrouding the planet. As the dust cleared, the spots were revealed to be extremely tall volcanoes whose summits had projected above the dust-laden, lower atmosphere.

== Name ==
Ascraeus Lacus had been named after Ascra, the rustic birthplace of Hesiod; in Greek, the word "ascraeus" is a poetic metonym for "rural." The volcano's name officially became Ascraeus Mons in 1973.

== General description ==
Map of Tharsis quadrangle.

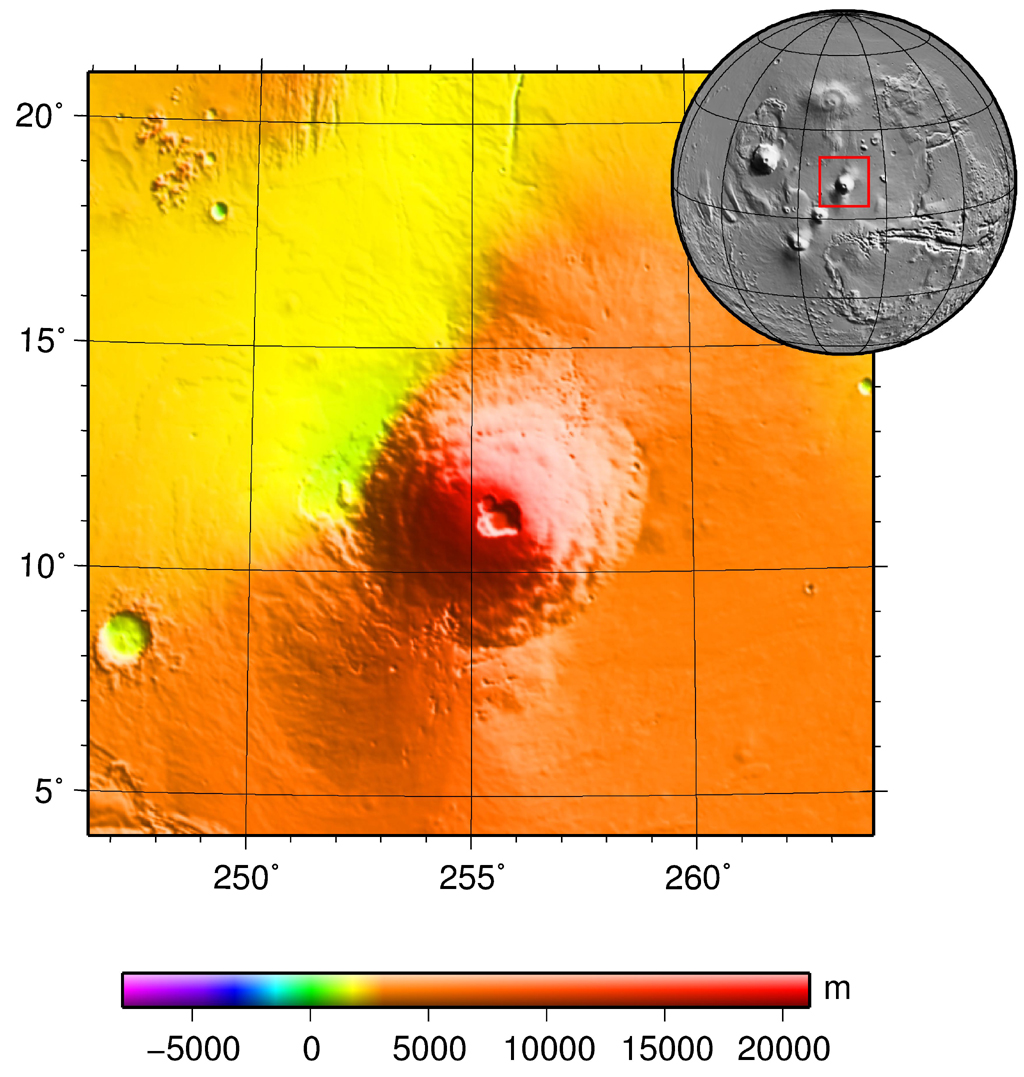
Colorized MOLA topography of Ascraeus Mons and its neighbourhood. Note the broad lava aprons at the southwestern and northeastern edges of the volcano. Also, note that the surrounding lava plains to the northwest have a much lower elevation than plains to the southeast.

The volcano is located in the southeast-central portion of the Tharsis quadrangle at 11.8°N, 255.5°E in Mars's western hemisphere. A group of three smaller volcanoes (the Ceraunius-Uranius group) lies about 700 km to the northeast, and Pavonis Mons (the middle volcano of the Tharsis Montes) lies 500 km to the southwest. The 70-km diameter crater Poynting is located 300 km to the west-southwest.

Ascraeus Mons is roughly 480 km in diameter and is the second highest mountain on Mars, with a summit elevation of 18.1 km. The volcano has a very low profile with an average flank slope of 7°. Slopes are steepest in the middle portion of the flanks, flattening out toward the base and near the top where a broad summit plateau and caldera (collapse crater) complex are located.

Volcanic vents, located on the northeastern and southwestern edges of the volcano, are sources for broad lava aprons, or fans, that bury nearby portions of the volcano and extend over 100 km out into the surrounding plains. The southwest–northeast orientation of the aprons matches the orientation of the Tharsis Montes, suggesting that a major fissure or rift in the Martian crust is responsible for the orientation of both the aprons and the Tharsis Montes chain. The presence of the lava aprons causes some disagreement in the actual dimensions of the volcano, as the definition of where the volcano ends can be quite arbitrary. If the aprons are included as part of the edifice then Ascraeus Mons has dimensions closer to 375 × 870 km.

Like most of the Tharsis region, Ascraeus Mons has a high albedo (reflectivity) and low thermal inertia, indicating that the volcano and surrounding areas are covered with large amounts of fine dust. (See the Martian Surface.) The dust forms a mantle over the surface that obscures or mutes much of the fine-scale topography and geology of the region. Tharsis is probably dusty because of its high elevations. The atmospheric density is too low to mobilize and remove dust once it is deposited. The atmospheric pressure at the summit of Ascraeus Mons averages 100 pascal (1.0 mbar); this is only 17% of the average surface pressure of 600 pascal.

Ascraeus Mons is surrounded by lava flow plains that are mid to late Amazonian in age. The elevation of the plains averages about 3 km above datum (Martian "sea" level), giving the volcano an average vertical relief of 15 km. However, the elevation of the plains varies considerably. The plains northwest of the volcano are less than 2 km in elevation. The plains are highest (>3 km) southeast of the volcano.

The lava plains northwest of Ascraeus Mons are notable for having two dark collapse pits photographed by the HiRISE camera on the Mars Reconnaissance Orbiter (MRO) in November 2010 (pictured in gallery below). The pits resemble those imaged around Arsia Mons by the Mars Odyssey spacecraft. The two pits measure about 180 and 310 m wide, and the larger pit is approximately 180 meters deep. The eastern walls of the pits consist of steep, overhanging ledges. The bottoms of both pits contain sediments and large boulders. These rimless pit craters are believed to form by collapse of surface material into a subsurface void created either by a dike or lava tube. They are analogous to volcanic pit craters on Earth, such as the Devil's Throat crater on the upper east rift zone of Kilauea Volcano, Hawaii. In some cases, they may mark skylights/entrances to subsurface lava caves.

== Geology ==
Ascraeus Mons was built by many thousands of fluid basaltic lava flows. Except for its great size, it resembles terrestrial shield volcanoes like those that form the Hawaiian Islands. The flanks of Ascraeus Mons are covered with narrow, lobate lava flows and lava channels. Many of the lava flows have levees along their margins. Levees are parallel ridges formed at the edges of lava flows. The cooler, outer margins of the flow solidify, leaving a central trough of molten, flowing lava. Partially collapsed lava tubes are visible as chains of pit craters.

By examining the morphologies of lava flow structures on Ascraeus Mons, geologists are able to calculate the rheological properties of the lava and estimate the rate at which it poured out during eruption (effusion rate). Results show that the lava was highly fluid (low viscosity) with low yield strength, resembling Hawaiian and Icelandic basaltic lavas. Average effusion rates are about 185 m^{3}/s. These rates are comparable to those seen in Hawaii and Iceland. Earth-based radar studies show that Ascraeus Mons has a higher radar echo strength than other volcanic structures on the planet. This could indicate that the lava flows on the flanks of Ascraeus Mons consist of rough ʻAʻā-type flows, a conclusion supported by photogeologic analysis of lava flow morphologies.

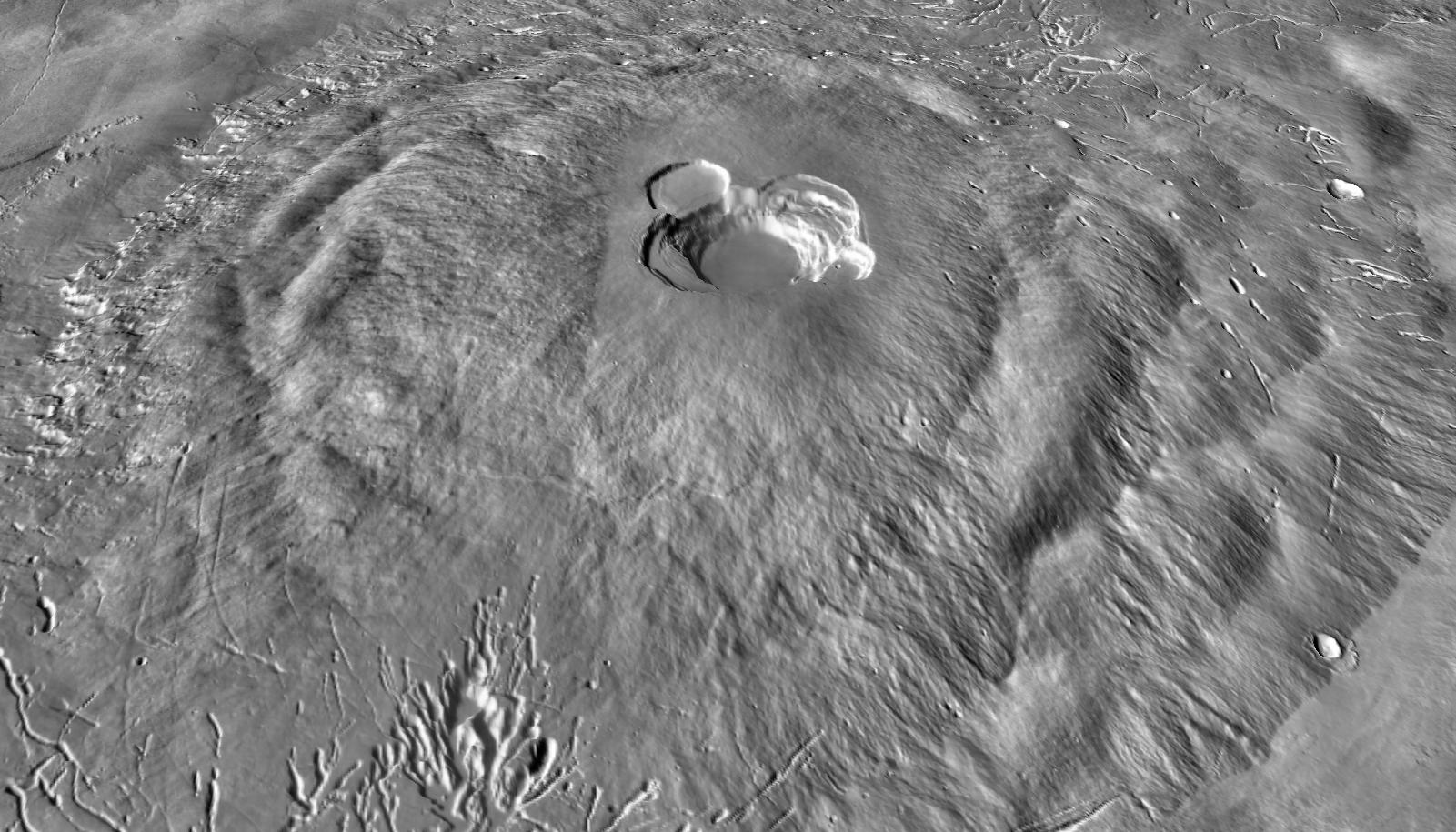
Flank terraces on slopes of Ascraeus Mons give the volcano's northwestern (left) and southeastern flanks (right) a rumpled appearance. Note the numerous depressions and channels on the volcano's southwestern flank (bottom). Vertical exaggeration is 3x. Image is THEMIS IR daytime mosaic overlain on MOLA topography.

The flanks of Ascraeus Mons have a rumpled appearance caused by numerous low, rounded terrace-like structures arranged concentrically around the summit of the volcano. The terraces are spaced 30 to 50 km apart, have lengths up to 100 km, radial widths of 30 km, and heights of about 3 km. Individual terraces are not continuous around the volcano, but instead consist of arcuate segments that overlap with each other, forming an imbricate pattern. They are interpreted to be the surface expression of thrust faults that formed due to compression along the volcano's flanks. Flank terraces are also common on Olympus Mons and the other Tharsis shield volcanoes. The source of the compressive stresses is still debated. The flank terraces may be due to compressional failure of the volcano, flexing of the underlying lithosphere due to the volcano's massive weight, cycles of magma chamber inflation and deflation, or shallow gravitational slumping.

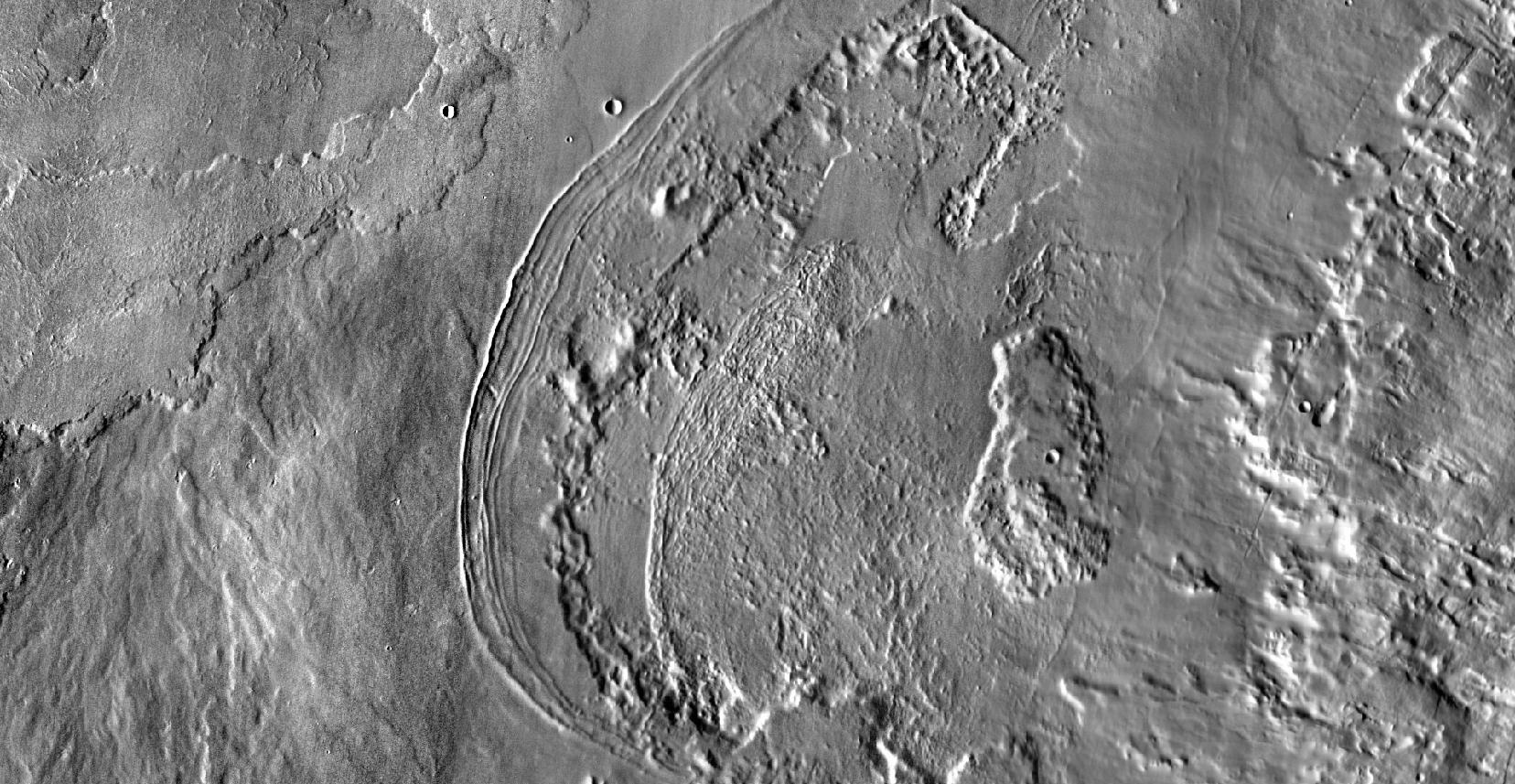
THEMIS IR daytime mosaic of fan-shaped deposit at western edge of Ascraeus Mons. The deposits are believed to be glacial moraines formed by mountain glaciers.

Fissures, or flank vents, at the southwestern and northeastern edges of the volcano are the sources of the lava aprons that spread out across the surrounding plains. The fissures seem to have formed by the merger of numerous, narrow rille-like depressions. In places, the depressions form sinuous channels with islands and other features suggestive of erosion by a fluid. Whether the channels were formed predominately by water or lava is still a topic of debate, though extensive study of analogous environments (e.g. Hawaii, the Moon, elsewhere on Mars) and morphologic features by multiple researchers has led to the conclusion that a volcanic origin is most probable.

The caldera complex consists of a central caldera surrounded by four coalesced calderas. The central caldera measures about 24 km across and 3.4 km deep and is the youngest of the collapse structures. Crater counting indicates that the central caldera is about 100 million years (Myr) old. The surrounding calderas have ages of about 200, 400, and 800 Myr old, or earlier. A small, partly preserved depression southeast of the main caldera may be as old as 3.8 billion years (Gyr). If the dates are valid, then Ascraeus Mons may have been active through most of Mars's history.

An area of peculiar, fan-shaped deposits (FSD) lies on the volcano's western flank. The FSD consists of a zone of knobby terrain outlined by a semicircular zone of concentric ridges. Similar deposits are also found at the northwestern edges of the other two Tharsis Montes, Pavonis Mons and Arsia Mons, as well as on Olympus Mons. The FSD at Ascraeus Mons is the smallest of those on the Tharsis Montes, covering an area of 14,000 km^{2} and extending outward from the volcano's base for about 100 km. The origin of these deposits has been debated for decades. However, recent geologic evidence suggests that FSDs are deposits left by glaciers, which covered portions of the volcanoes during a recent period of high obliquity. During periods of high obliquity (axial tilt) the polar regions receive higher levels of sunlight. More water from the poles enters the atmosphere and condenses as ice or snowfall in the cooler equatorial regions. Mars changes its obliquity from about 15° to 35° in cycles of 120,000 years.

== Gallery ==
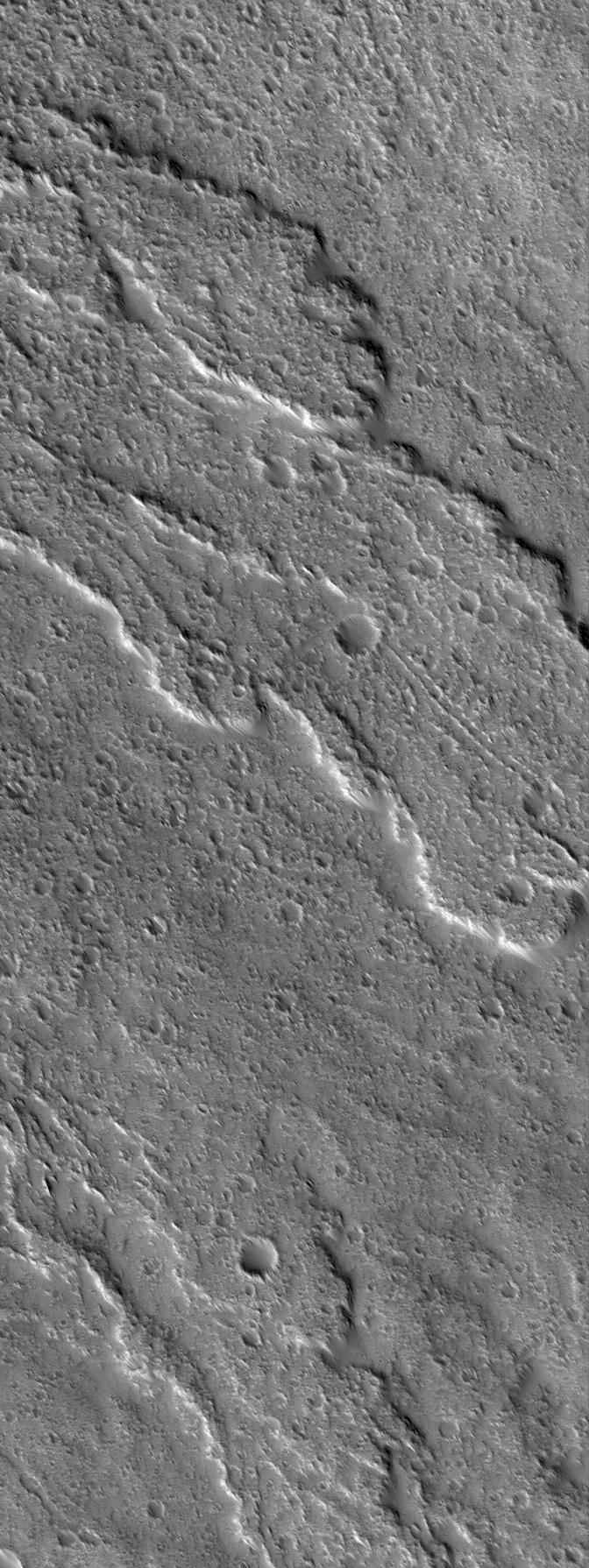
Mars Global Surveyor Mars Orbital Camera (MOC) image of lobate lava flows on flank of Ascraeus Mons.

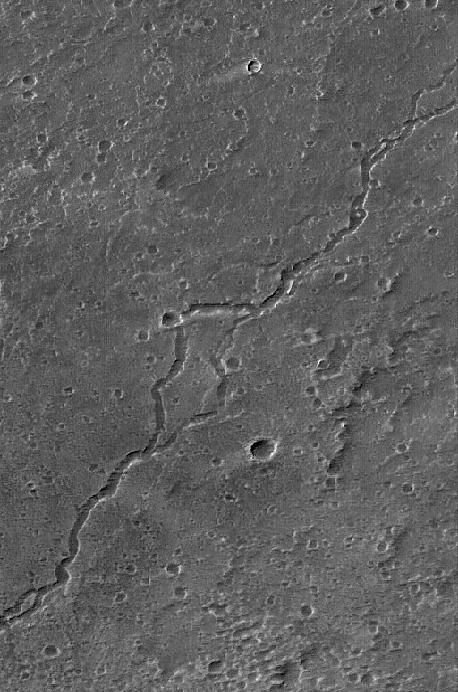
Mars Global Surveyor Mars Orbiter Camera (MOC) image of lava channel on the northeastern summit of Ascraeus Mons.

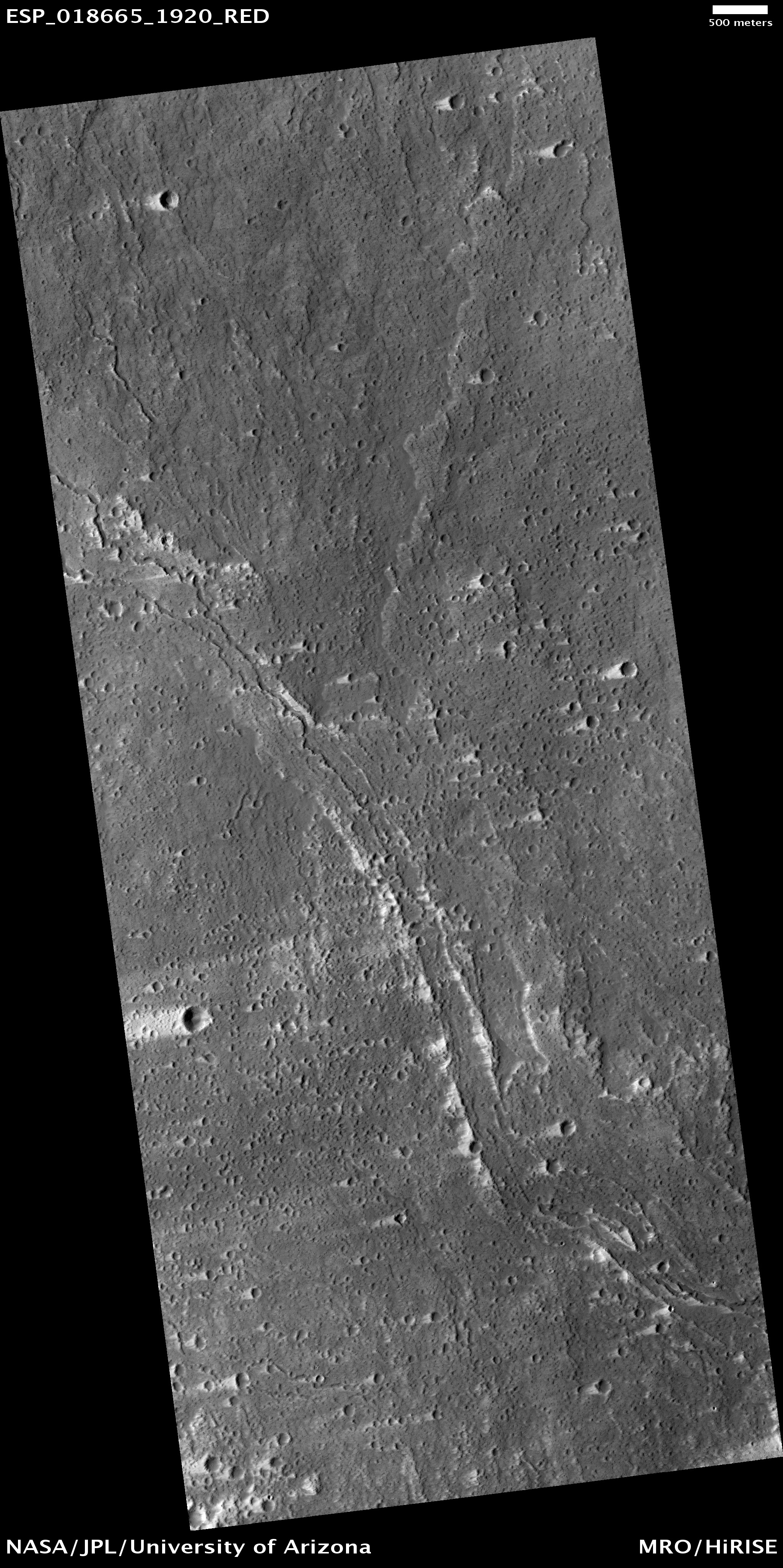
HiRISE image of channelized lava flow with levees on Northern flank of Ascraeus Mons.

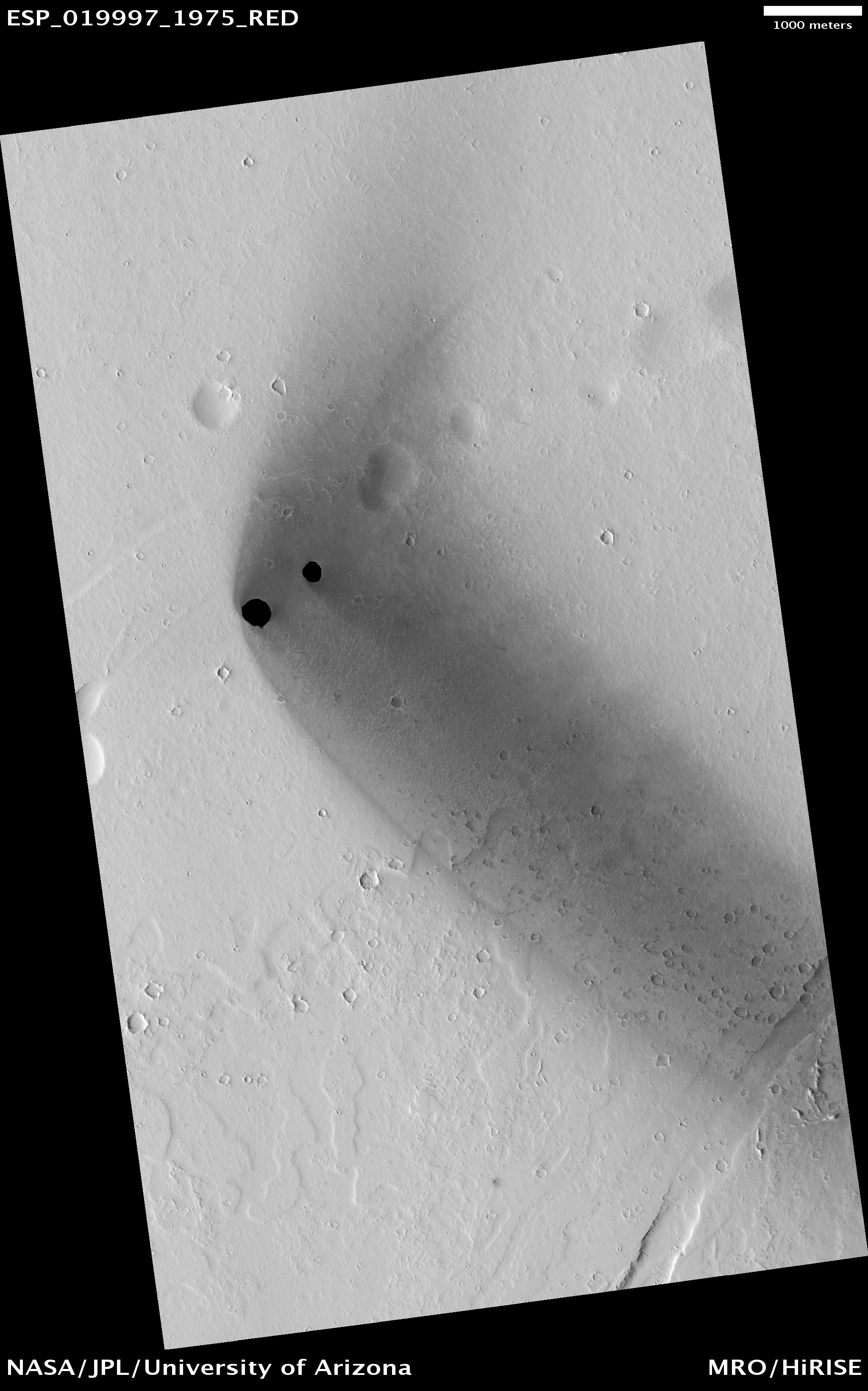
HiRISE image of dark rimless pits northwest of Ascraeus Mons.

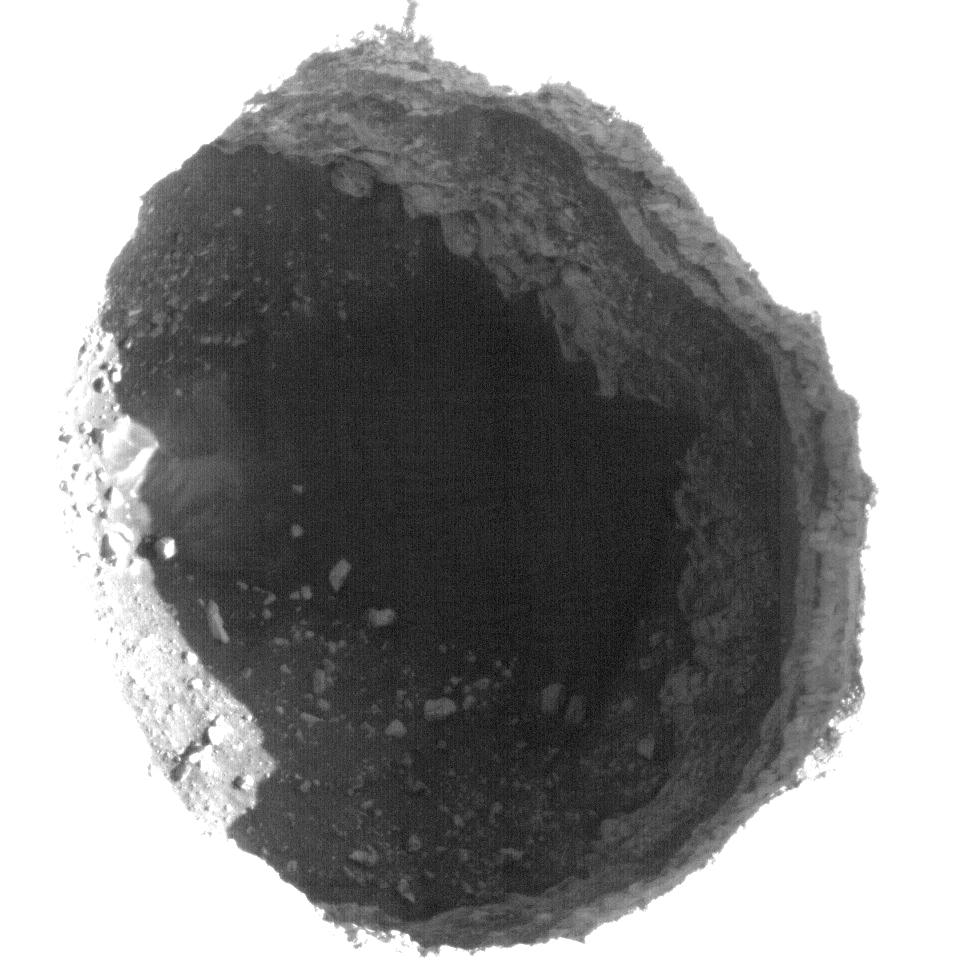
Closeup of pit northwest of Ascraeus Mons. Contrast has been stretched to reveal interior features.

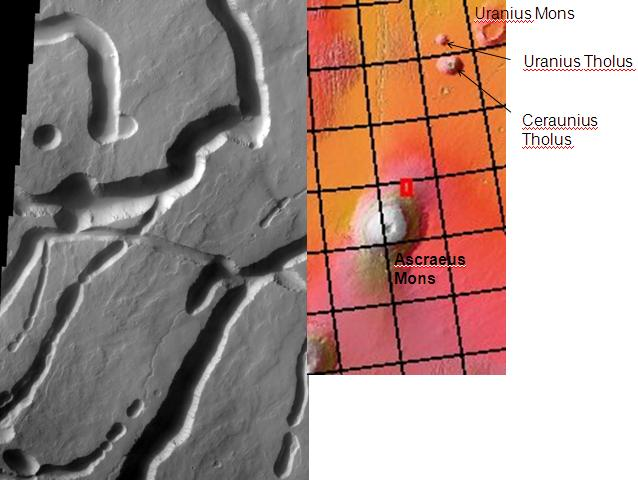
Channels on the northwest side of Ascraeus Mons. Some may be collapsed lava tubes.

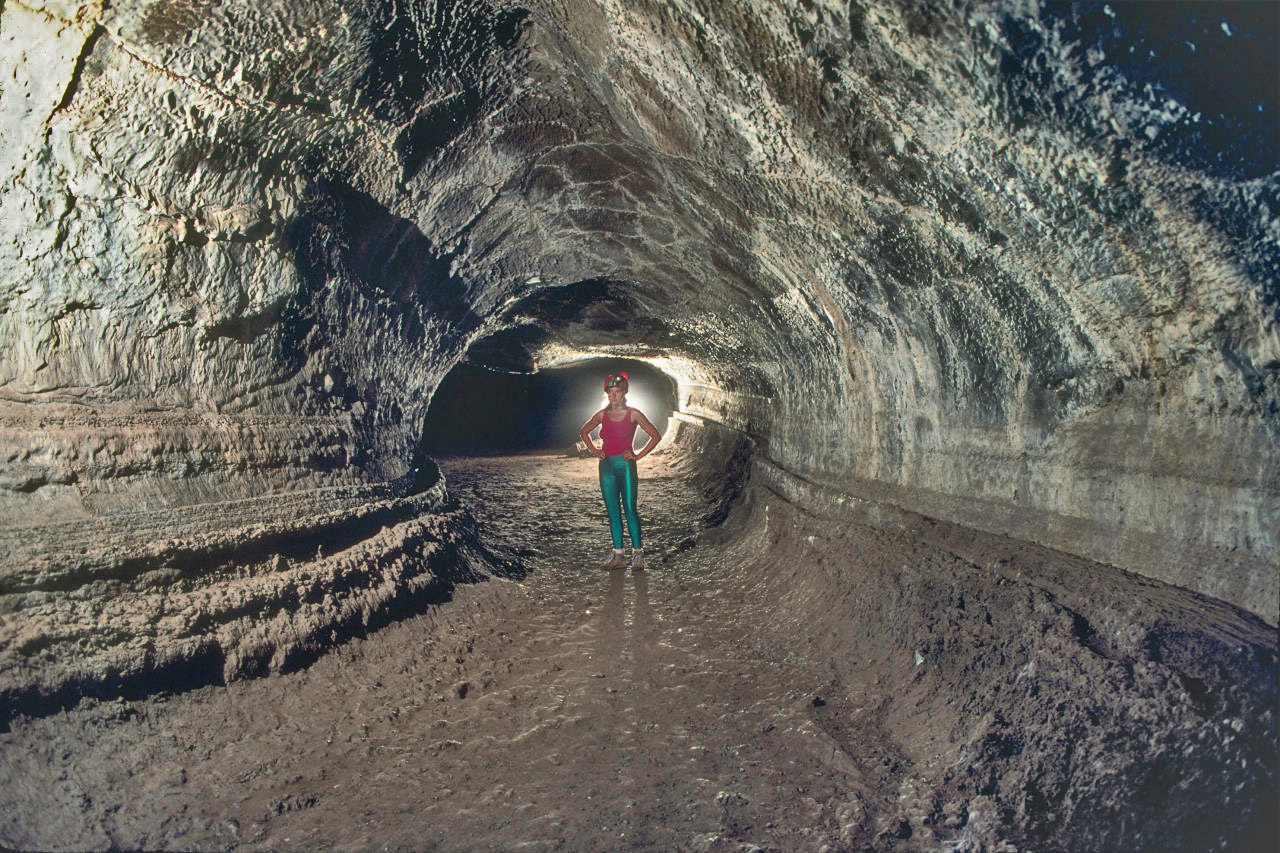
Valentine Cave in Lava Beds National Monument, California. This shows the classic tube shape; the grooves on the wall mark former flow levels. Pits near volcanic regions of Mars may be openings to caves like this.

== See also ==
- List of mountains on Mars by height
- Tharsis quadrangle
- List of tallest mountains in the Solar System
