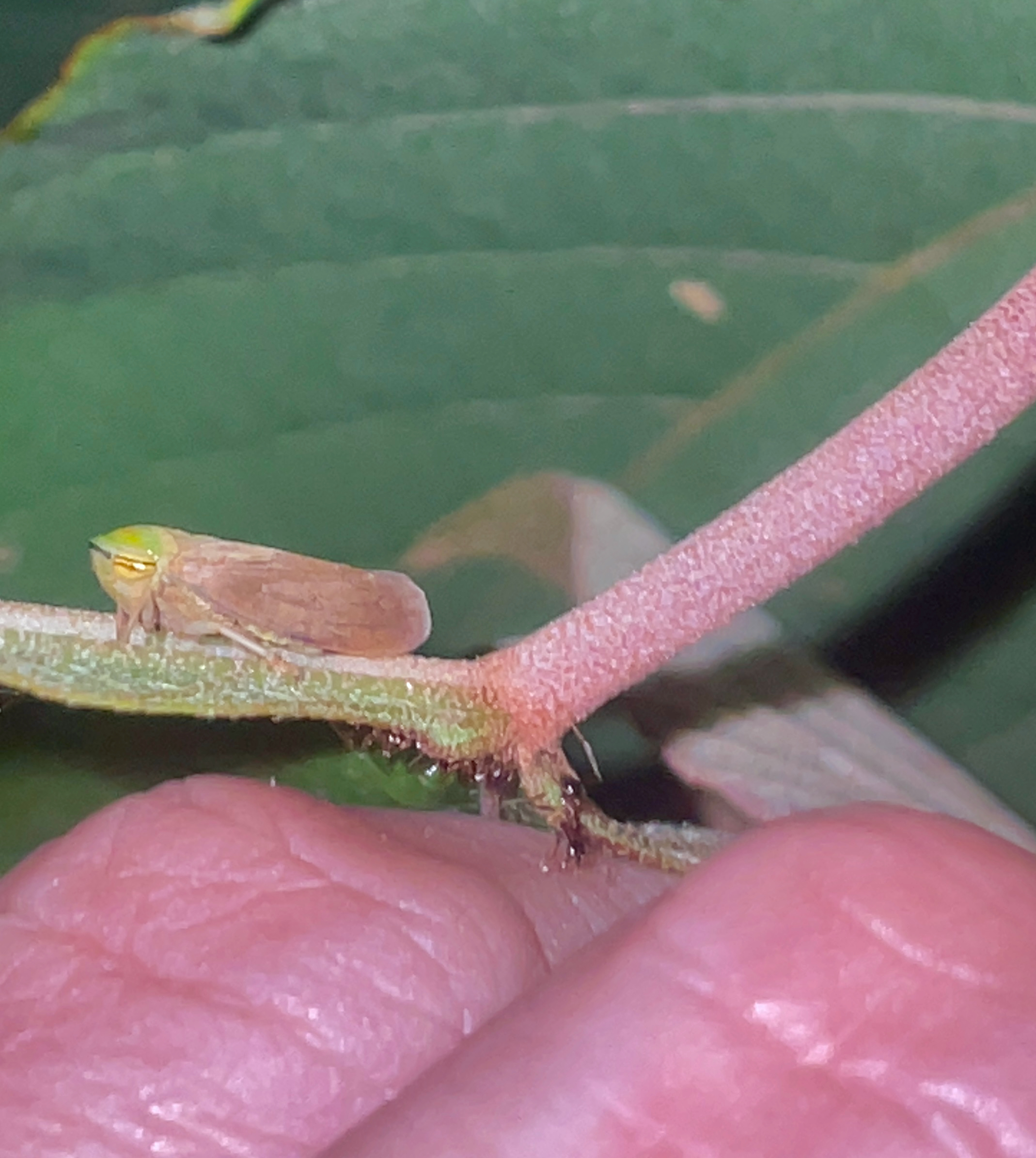
- Tartessus ferrugineus

Scientific classification
- Kingdom: Animalia
- Phylum: Arthropoda
- Clade: Pancrustacea
- Class: Insecta
- Order: Hemiptera
- Suborder: Auchenorrhyncha
- Superfamily: Membracoidea
- Family: Cicadellidae
- Subfamily: Tartessinae; Distant, 1908

= Tartessinae =

Subfamily of true bugs

The Tartessinae are a subfamily of leafhoppers, originally erected by as a family by William Lucas Distant in 1908. In terms of numbers of genera and species, this subfamily is dominated by the tribe Tartessini, with about 150 described species from India, Japan, SE Asia through to Australia.

== Tribes and genera ==
The World Auchenorrhyncha Database includes:

Neopsini

Authority: Linnavuori, 1977 - South America (about 14 spp.)

1. Neopsis Oman, 1938
2. Nollia Hamilton, 1983

=== Tartessini Distant, 1908 ===
1. Alosarpestus Evans, 1981
2. Alotartessella Evans, 1981
3. Alotartessus Evans, 1981
4. Austrotartessus Evans, 1981
5. Borditartessus Evans, 1981
6. Borduria (bug) Distant, 1908
7. Brunotartessus Evans, 1981
8. Bulotartessus Evans, 1981
9. Calotartessus Evans, 1981
10. Distantessus Evans, 1981
11. Dorrotartessus Evans, 1981
12. Duatartessus Evans, 1981
13. Eutartessus Evans, 1981
14. Fedotartessus Evans, 1981
15. Flavitartessus Evans, 1981
16. Furcatartessus Evans, 1981
17. Infulatartessus Evans, 1981
18. Iriatartessus Evans, 1981
19. Kaltitartessus Evans, 1981
20. Macrotartessus Evans, 1981
21. Microtartessus Evans, 1981
22. Milotartessus Evans, 1981
23. Neotartessus Evans, 1981
24. Newmaniana Evans, 1942
25. Nigritartessus Evans, 1981
26. Philotartessus Evans, 1981
27. Phytotartessus Evans, 1981
28. Plexitartessus Evans, 1981
29. Protartessus Evans, 1981
30. Sarpestus Spångberg, 1878
31. Spanotartessus Evans, 1981
32. Tartessella Evans, 1937
33. Tartessoides Evans, 1937
34. Tartessops Evans, 1981
35. Tartessus Stål, 1865
36. Tenuitartessus Evans, 1981
37. Triviotartessus Evans, 1981
38. Unguitartessus Evans, 1981

Incertae sedis

- genus Tardrabassus Dai & Dietrich, 2012 – Vietnam, Laos
