= Ore resources on Mars =

Ore deposits on Mars that may be useful to future colonists

Mars may contain ores that would be very useful to potential colonists. The abundance of volcanic features together with widespread cratering are strong evidence for a variety of ores. While nothing may be found on Mars that would justify the high cost of transport to Earth, the more ores that future colonists can obtain from Mars, the easier it would be to build colonies there.

== How deposits are made ==
Ore deposits are produced with the help of large amounts of heat. On Mars, heat can come from molten rock moving under the ground and from crater impacts. Liquid rock under the ground is called magma. When magma sits in underground chambers, slowly cooling over thousands of years, heavier elements sink. These elements, including copper, chromium, iron, and nickel become concentrated at the bottom. When magma is hot, many elements are free to move. As cooling proceeds, the elements bind with each other to form chemical compounds or minerals. Because some elements do not bond easily to form minerals, they exist freely after nearly all the other elements have bonded into compounds or minerals. The remaining elements are called incompatible elements. Some of them are quite useful to humans. Some examples include niobium, a metal used in producing superconductors and specialty steels, lanthanum and neodymium, and europium for television monitors and energy-efficient LED light bulbs. After the mass of magma has cooled and has mostly frozen or crystallized into a solid, a small amount of liquid rock remains. This liquid bears important substances such as lead, silver, tin, bismuth, and antimony. Sometimes minerals in the magma chamber are so hot that they occupy a gaseous state. Others are mixed with water and sulfur in aqueous solutions. The gases and mineral-rich solutions eventually work their way into cracks and become useful mineral veins. Ore minerals, including the incompatible elements, remain dissolved in the hot solution, then crystallize out when the solution cools. Deposits created by means of these hot solutions are called hydrothermal deposits. Some of Earth's most significant deposits of gold, silver, lead, mercury, zinc, and tungsten started out this way. Nearly all the mines in the northern Black Hills of South Dakota came to be because of hot water deposits of minerals. Cracks often form when a mass of magma cools because magma contracts and hardens when it cools. Cracks occur both in the frozen magma mass and in the surrounding rocks, so ore is deposited in any kind of the rock that happens to be nearby, but the ore minerals first had to be concentrated by way of a molten mass of magma.

Research carried out at Louisiana State University found different types of volcanic materials around volcanoes in Elysium Mons. This showed that Mars can have a magma evolution. This leads to the possibility of finding useful minerals for a future human population on Mars."

== Molten rock on Mars ==
The presence of many huge volcanoes on Mars shows that large areas were very hot in the past. Olympus Mons is the largest volcano in the Solar System; Ceraunius Tholus, one of its smaller volcanoes, nears the height of Earth's Mount Everest.

Olympus Mons Region showing several large volcanoes

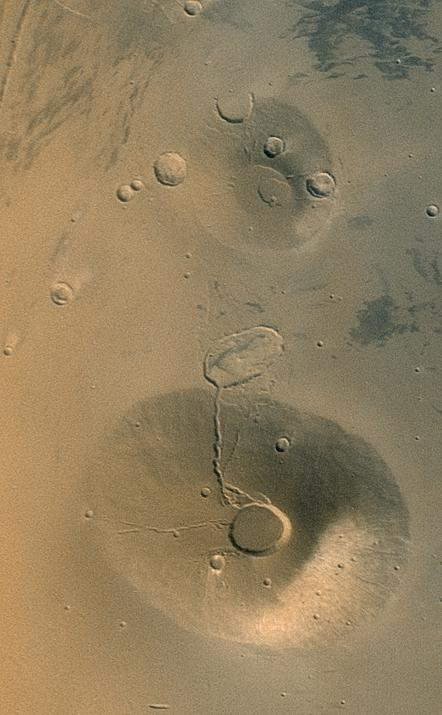
Lower volcano is Ceraunius Tholus and upper volcano is Uranius Tholus as seen by Mars Global Surveyor Mars Orbiter Camera. Ceraunius Tholus is about as high as Earth's Mount Everest.

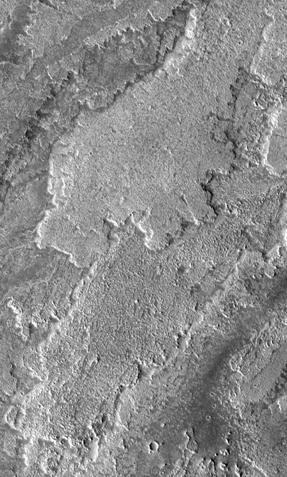
Lava flow, as seen by THEMIS. Note the shape of the edges.

There is strong evidence for much more widespread sources of heat in the form of dikes, which indicate that magma traveled under the ground. Dikes take the shape of walls and cut across rock layers. In some cases, dikes on Mars have become exposed by erosion.

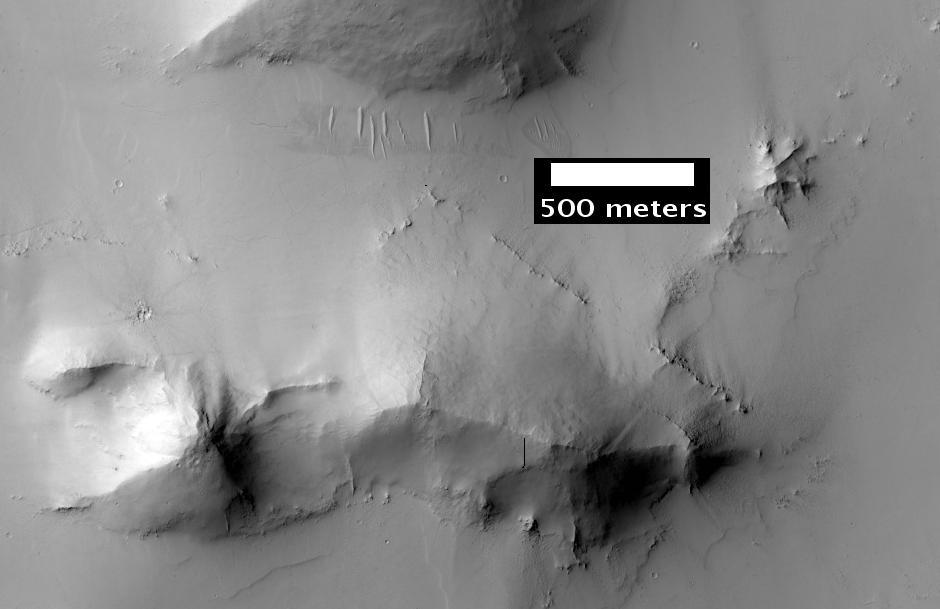
Possible dike in Syrtis Major quadrangle as seen by HiRISE under the HiWish program

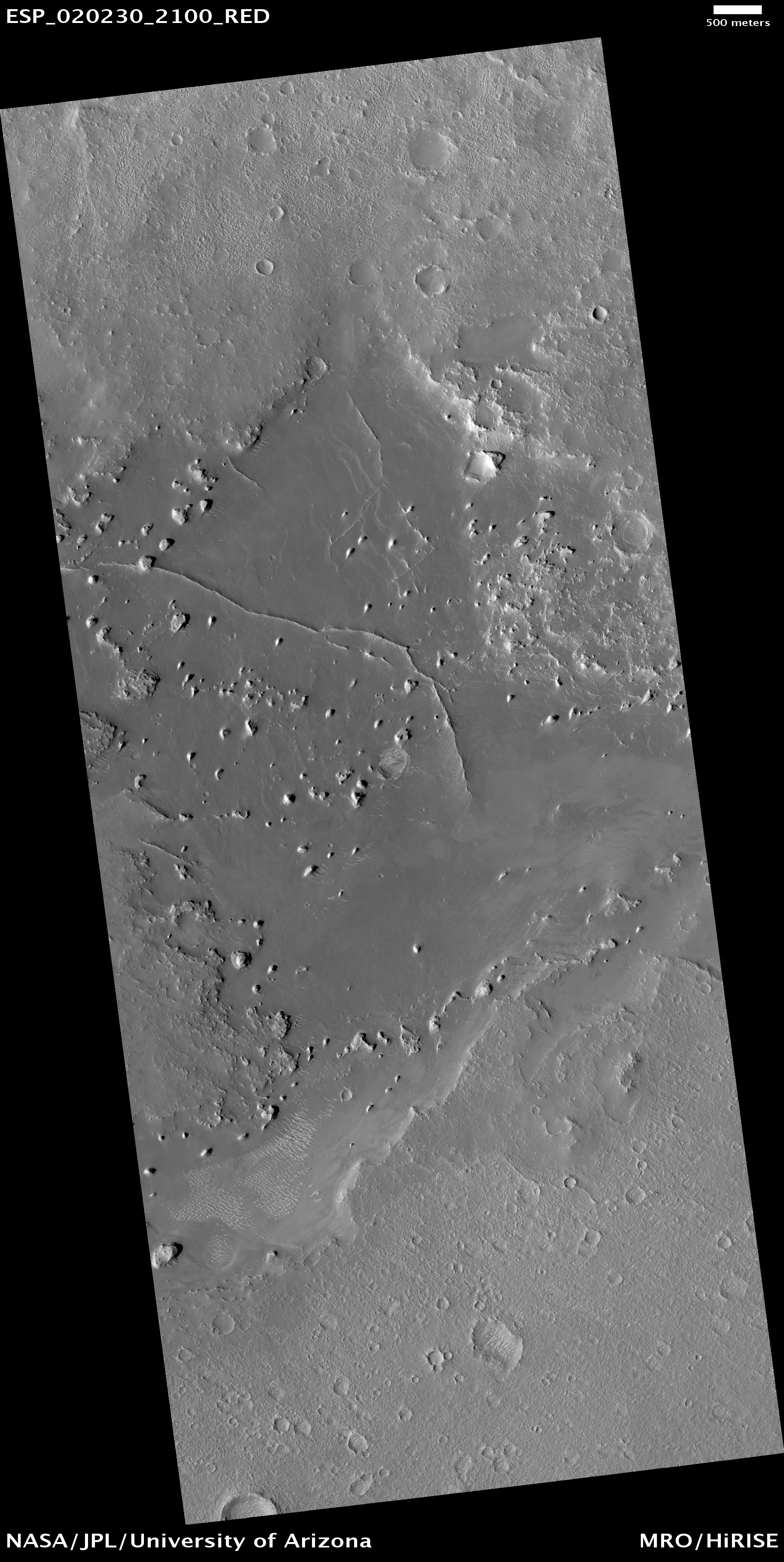
Dikes in Arabia, as seen by HiRISE, under the HiWish program. These straight features may indicate where valuable ore deposits may be found by future colonists. Scale bar is 500 meters.

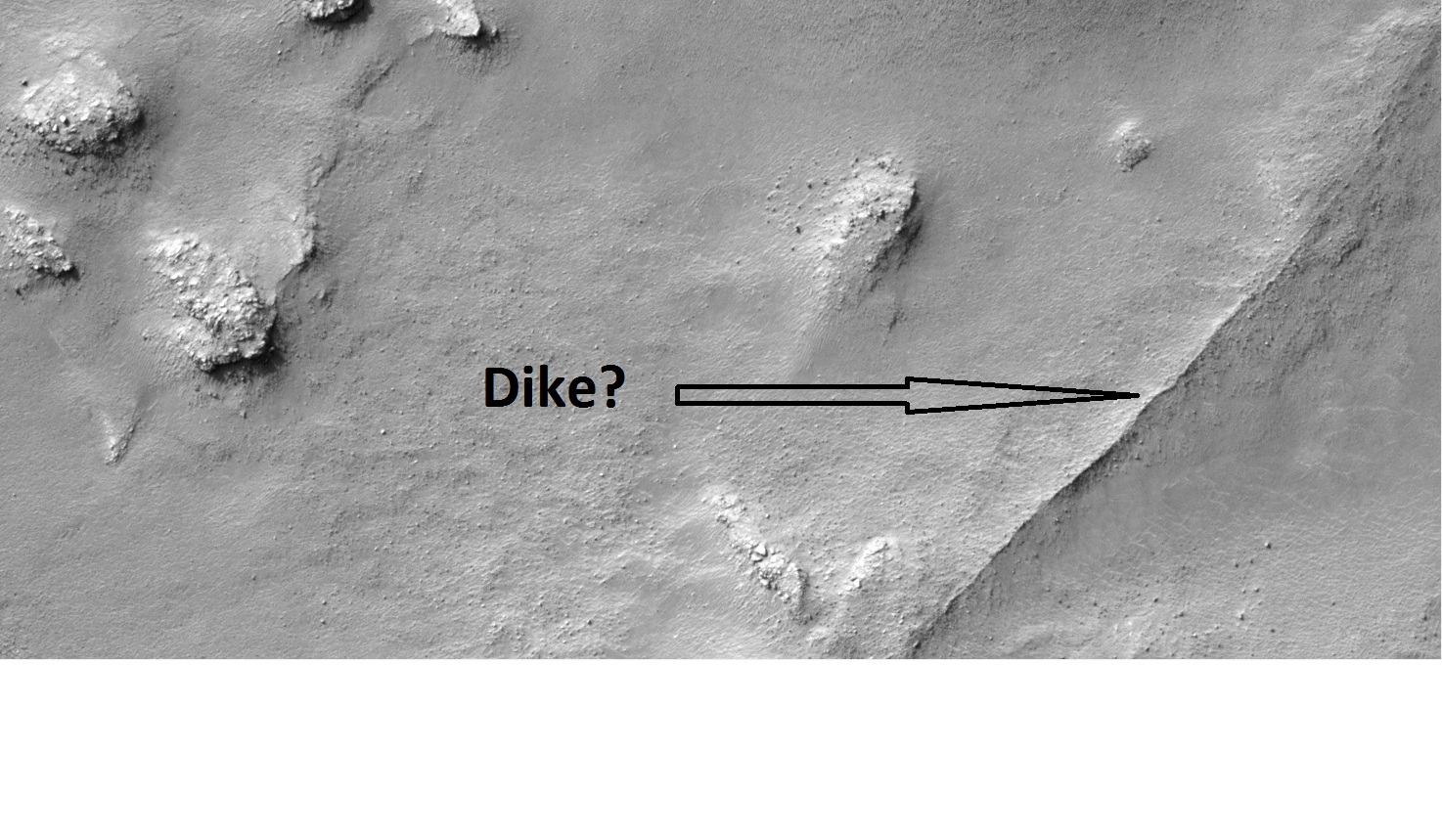
Possible dike in Thaumasia quadrangle, as seen by HiRISE under the HiWish program. Dikes may have deposited valuable minerals.

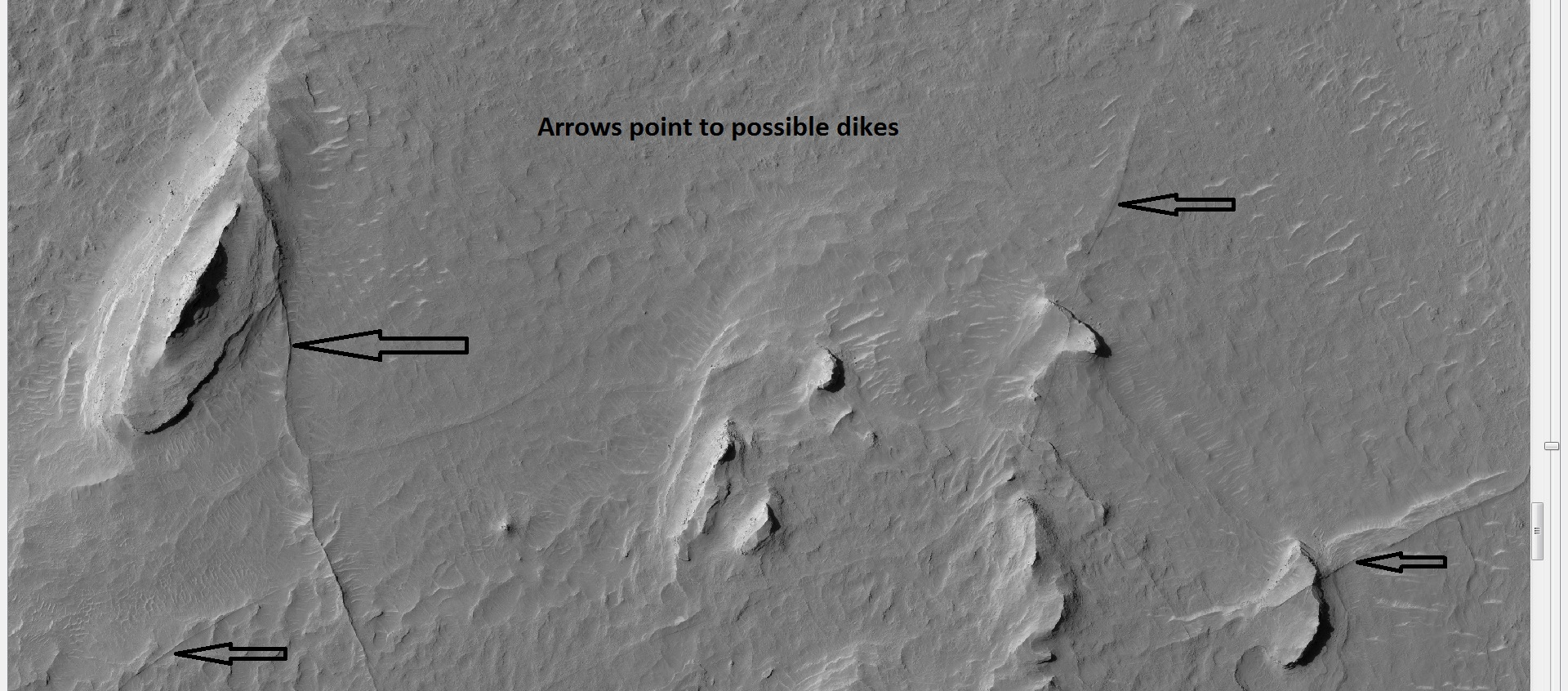
Possible dikes in Oxia Palus quadrangle, as seen by HiRISE under HiWish program

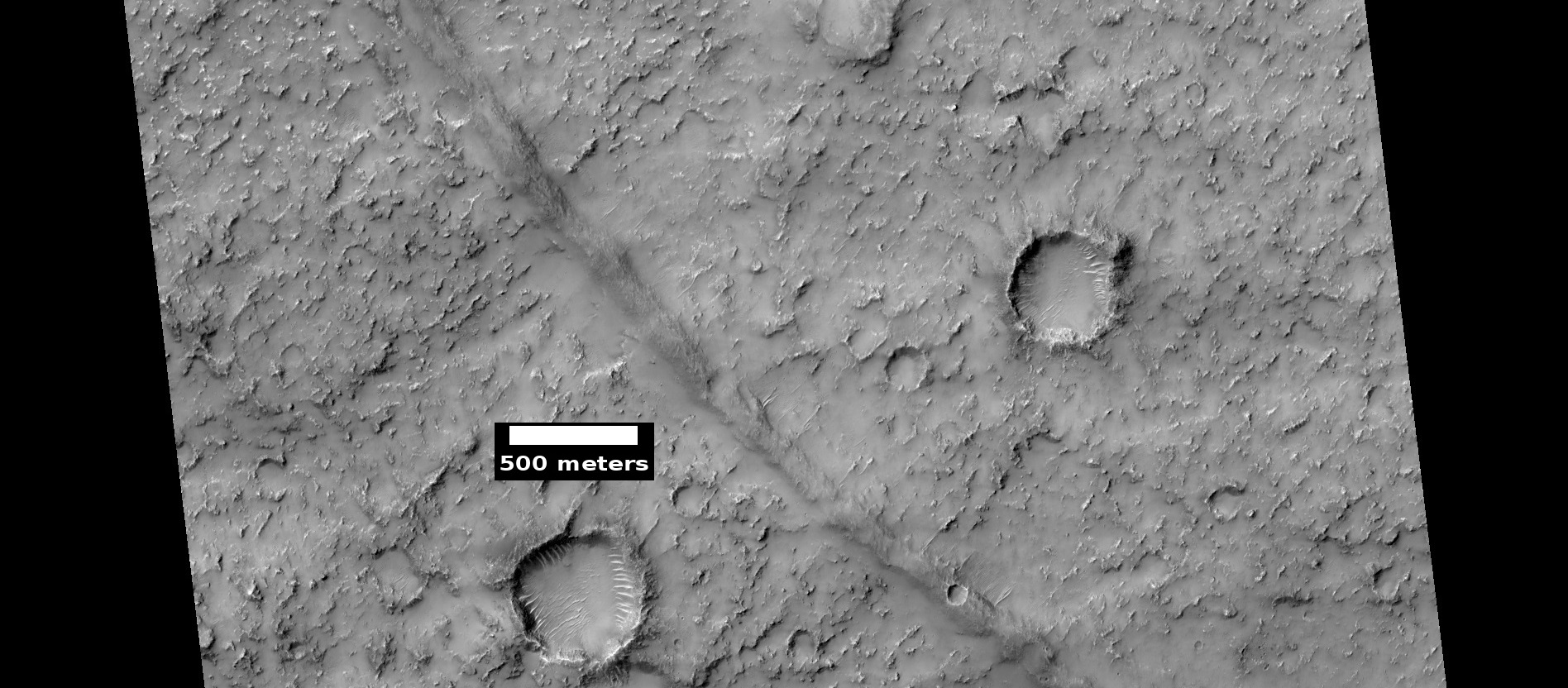
Possible dike, as seen by HiRISE under the HiWish program. Image located in Iapygia quadrangle.

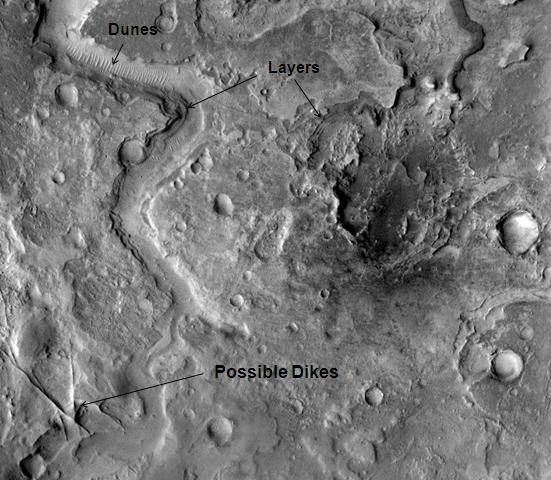
Straight ridges may be dikes in which liquid rock once flowed. The image is of Huo Hsing Vallis in Syrtis Major, as seen by THEMIS.

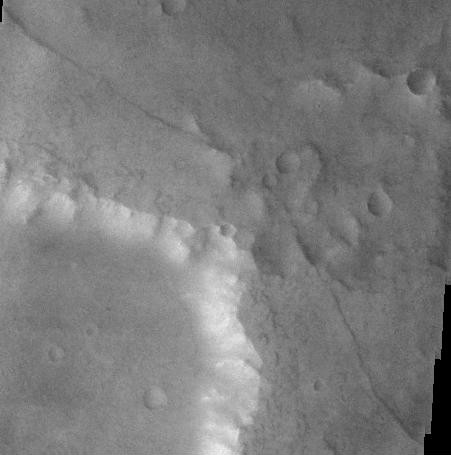
Dike near the crater Huygens shows up as a narrow dark line running from upper left to lower right, as seen by THEMIS.

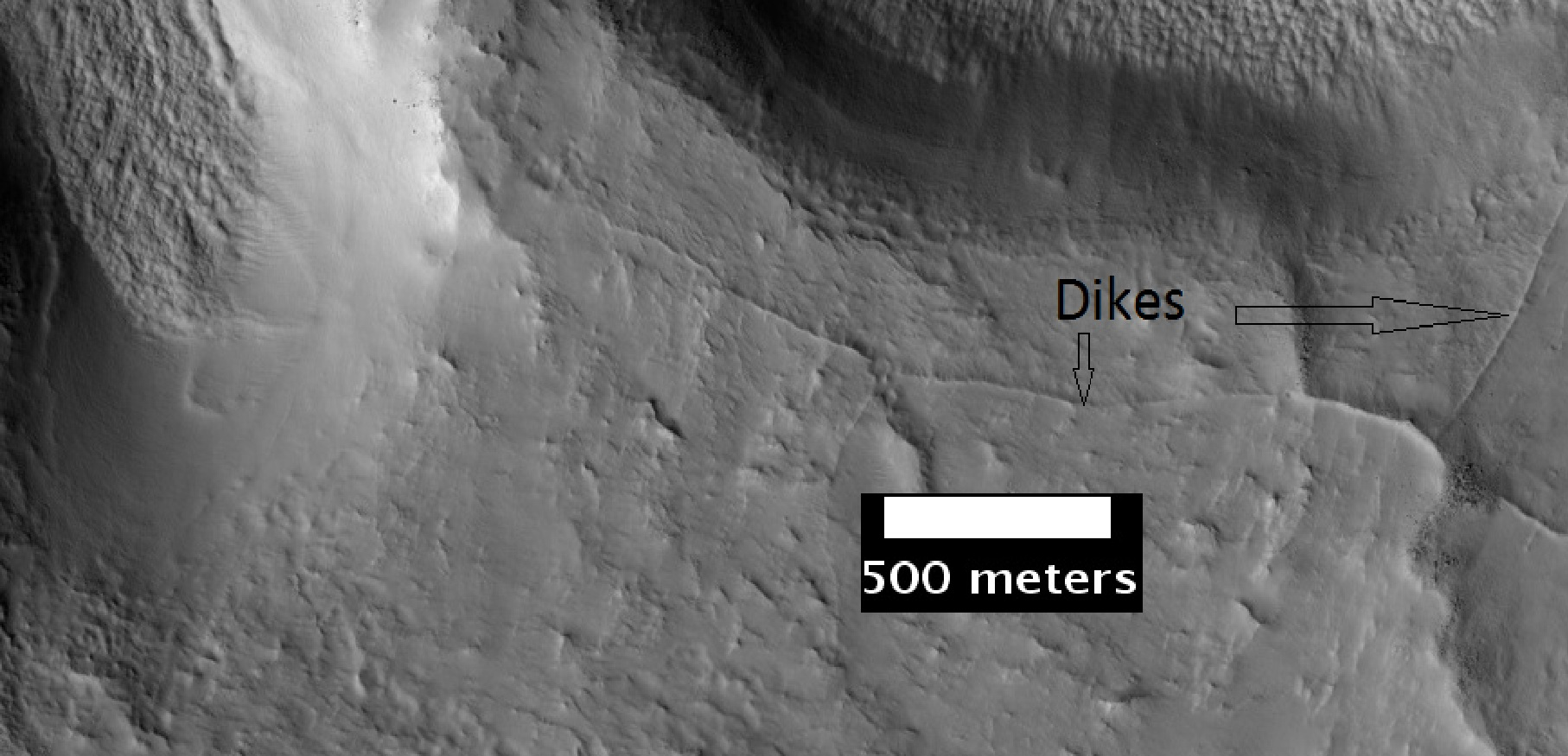
Dikes as seen by HiRISE under the HiWish program. An image in the Nilosyrtis region, in Casius quadrangle.

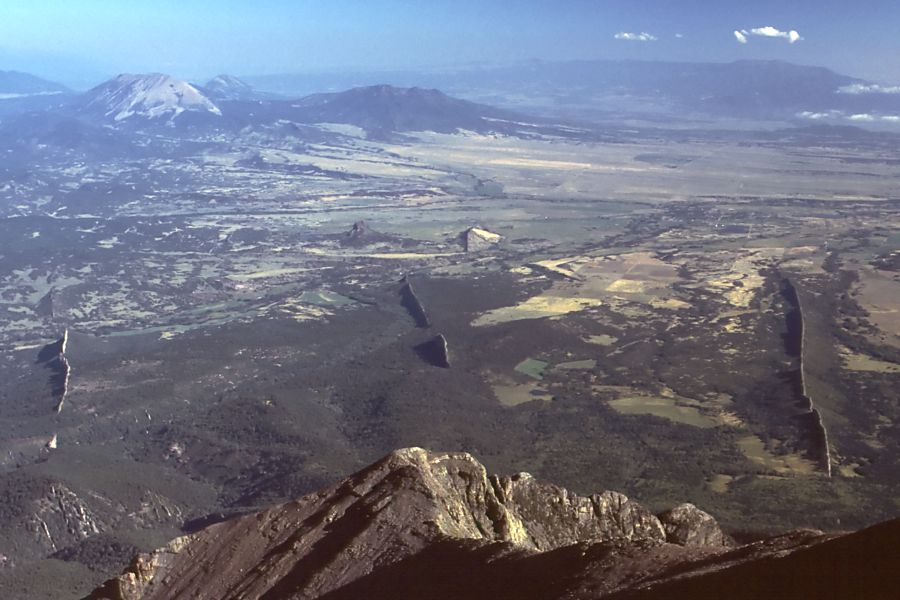
Dikes near Spanish Peaks, Colorado. Dikes like these are common on Mars.

Large areas of Mars contain troughs, called fossa, which are classified as grabens by geologists. They stretch thousands of miles out from volcanoes. It is believed that dikes helped with the formation of grabens. Many, maybe most, of the grabens had dikes under them. One would expect dikes and other igneous intrusions on Mars because geologists believe that the amount of liquid rock that moved under the ground is more than what we see on the top in the form of volcanoes and lava flows.

On Earth, vast volcanic landscapes are called large igneous provinces (LIPs); such places are sources of nickel, copper, titanium, iron, platinum, palladium, and chromium. Mars's Tharsis region, which contains a group of giant volcanoes, is considered to be a LIP.

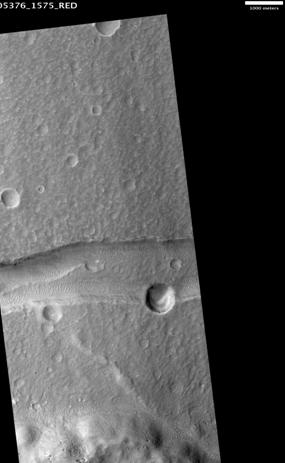
Graben in the Memnonia Fossae, as seen by HiRISE. This graben is believed to be the result of magmatic dikes rather than regional tectonic stretching (scale bar is 1.0 km).

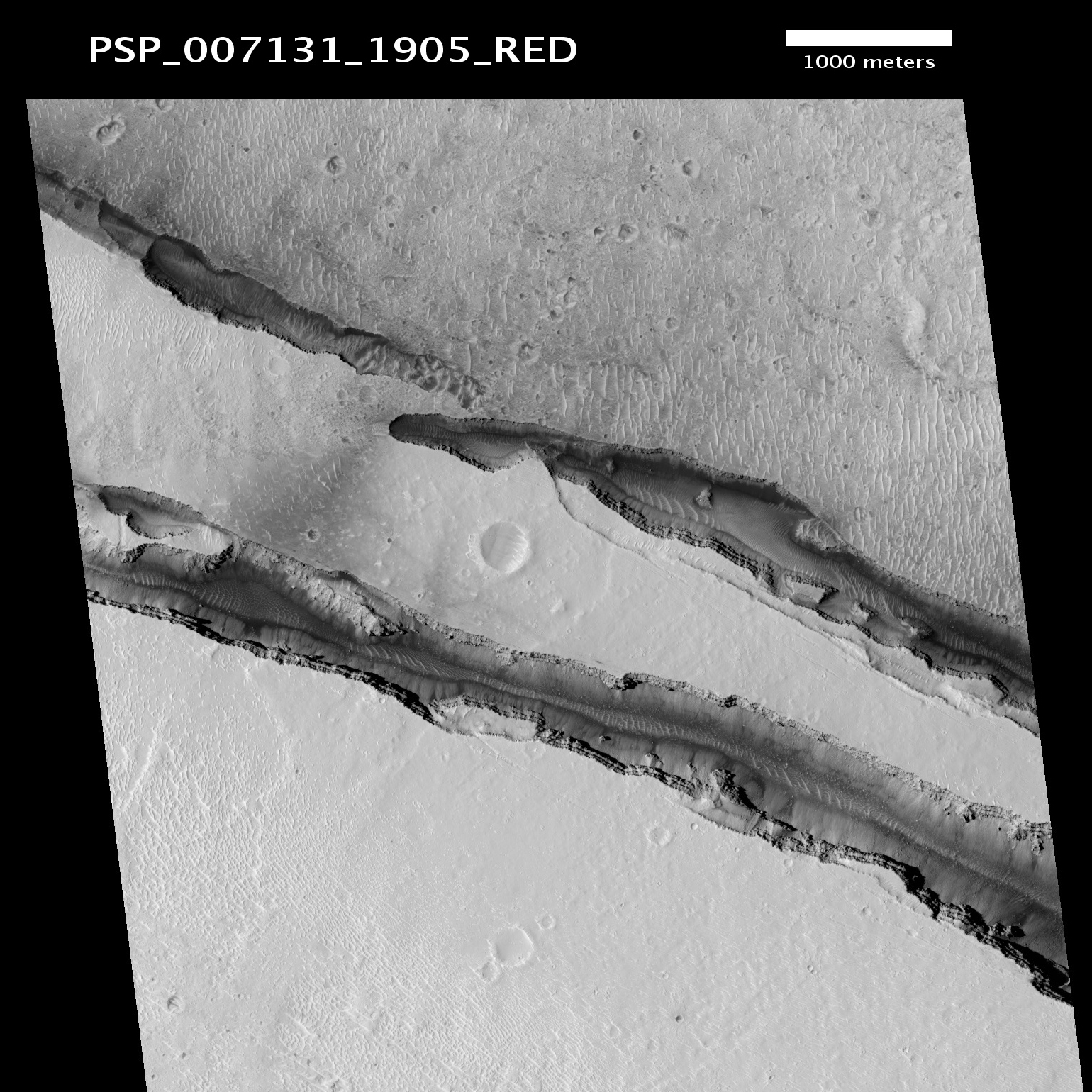
The Cerberus Fossae in the Elysium quadrangle, as seen by HiRISE

== Heat from impacts ==
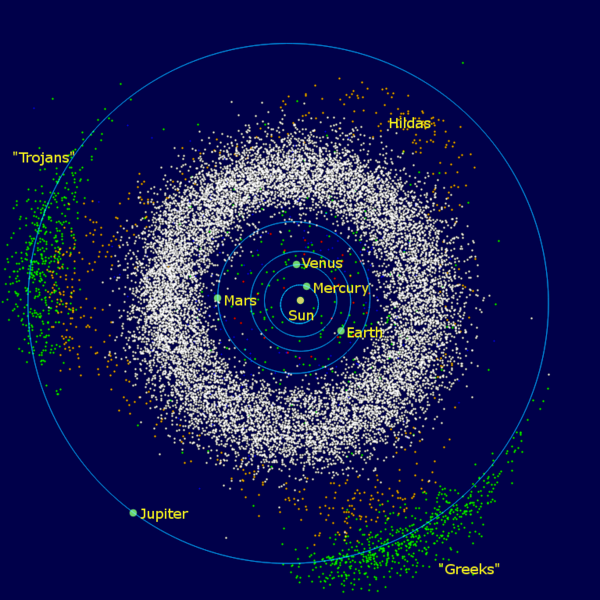
The Main asteroid belt (white) and the Trojan asteroids (green). Click on image to see more. Note how close the orbit of Mars is to the asteroid belt.

Besides heat generated by molten rock, Mars has had much heat produced when asteroids impacted its surface making giant craters. The area around a large impact may take hundreds of thousands of years to cool.

During that time, ice in the ground will melt, heat, dissolve minerals, then deposit them in cracks or faults that were produced with the impact. Studies on the earth have documented that cracks are produced and that secondary minerals veins are filled in the cracks. Images from satellites orbiting Mars have detected cracks near impact craters. Areas of aqueous and low-grade thermal alteration have been found by the Opportunity Rover on the rim of Endeavour crater. These are found near joints and fractures that allowed deep fluid circulation which caused chemical and thermal alteration of the rocks. So, the area around martian craters may contain a variety of minerals that were produced as an indirect result of an impact.

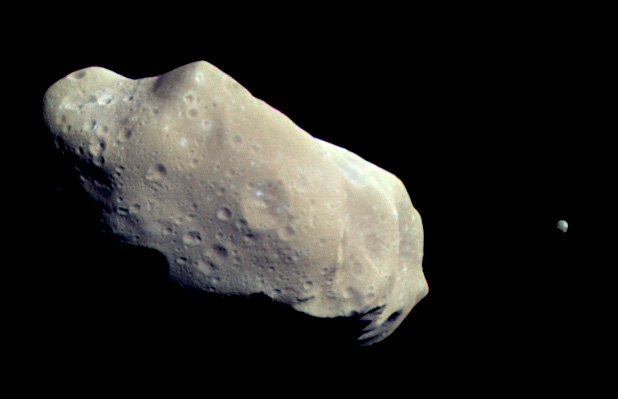
243 Ida and its moon Dactyl. Dactyl is the first satellite of an asteroid to be discovered.

Heat from impacts results from several processes. Immediately after an impact, there is a rebound off the floor which causes hotter rocks to be uplifted to the surface. However, most of the heat comes from the kinetic energy that is produced during the impact. This enormous heat creates several useful products that may start forming early and then continue for some time. These are called "epigenetic deposits." Circulation of hot mineral-rich fluids in the fractures from the impact cause hydrothermalism. Important examples are the Cu-Ni sulfides at the Sudbury Igneous Complex in Canada. For a number of years, these ores from the Sudbury area had a value of $2 billion each year. The Sudbury formation has provided us with ores of zinc, copper, gold, and lead.

Strong evidence for hydrothermalism was reported by a team of researchers studying Auki Crater. This crater contains ridges that may have been produced after fractures formed with an impact. Using instruments on the Mars Reconnaissance Orbiter they found the minerals Smectite, Silica, Zeolite, Serpentine, Carbonate, and Chlorite that are common in impact-induced hydrothermal systems on Earth. There is other evidence of post-impact hydrothermal systems on Mars from other scientists who studied other Martian craters.

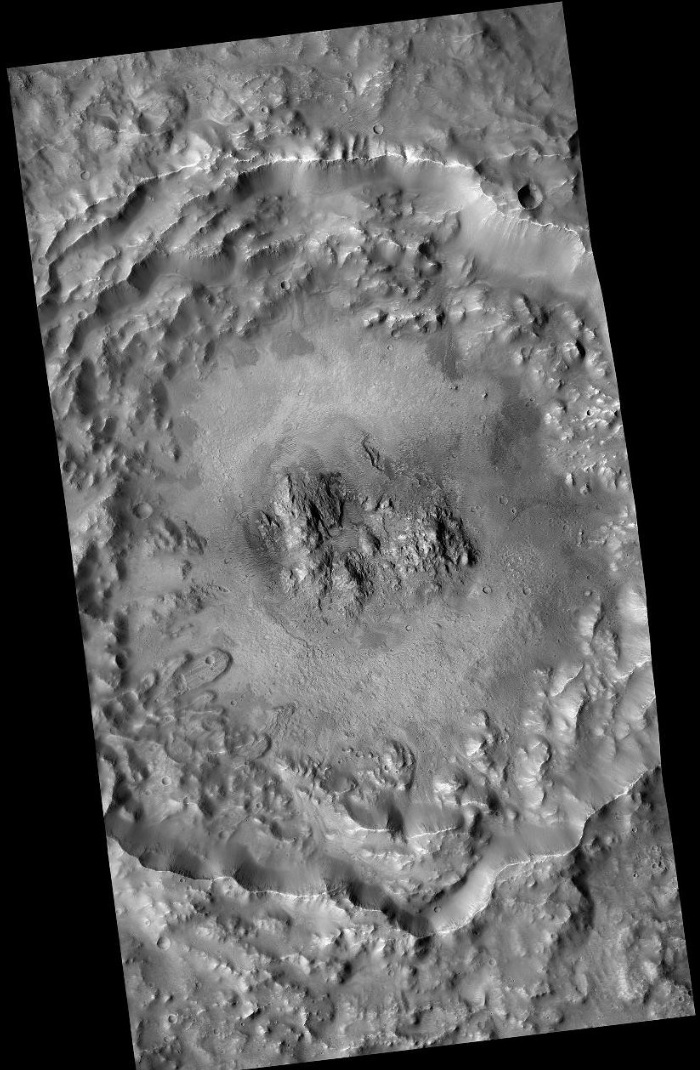
Wide view of Auki Crater, as seen by CTX

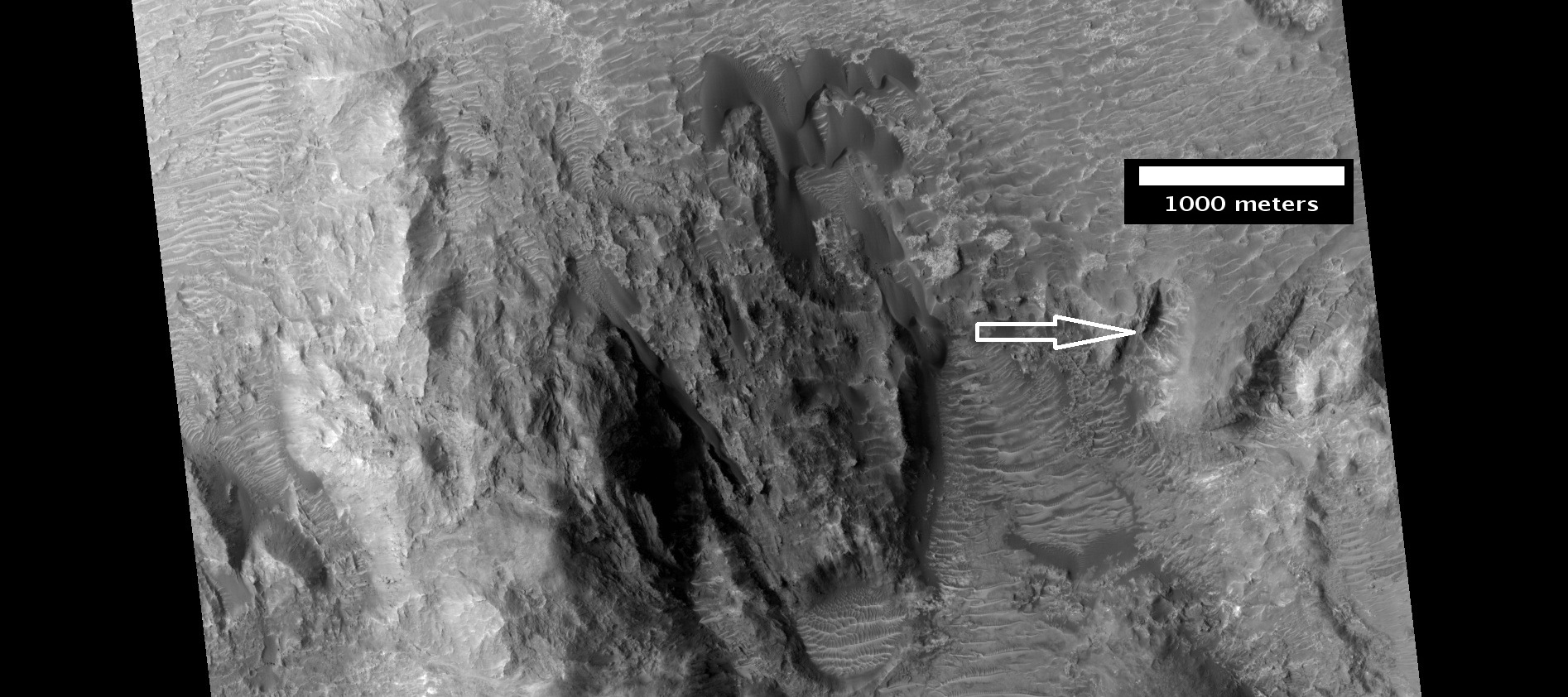
Close view of central portion of Auki Crater, as seen by HiRISE Arrow indicates ridges. Sand dunes are present near the top of the image.

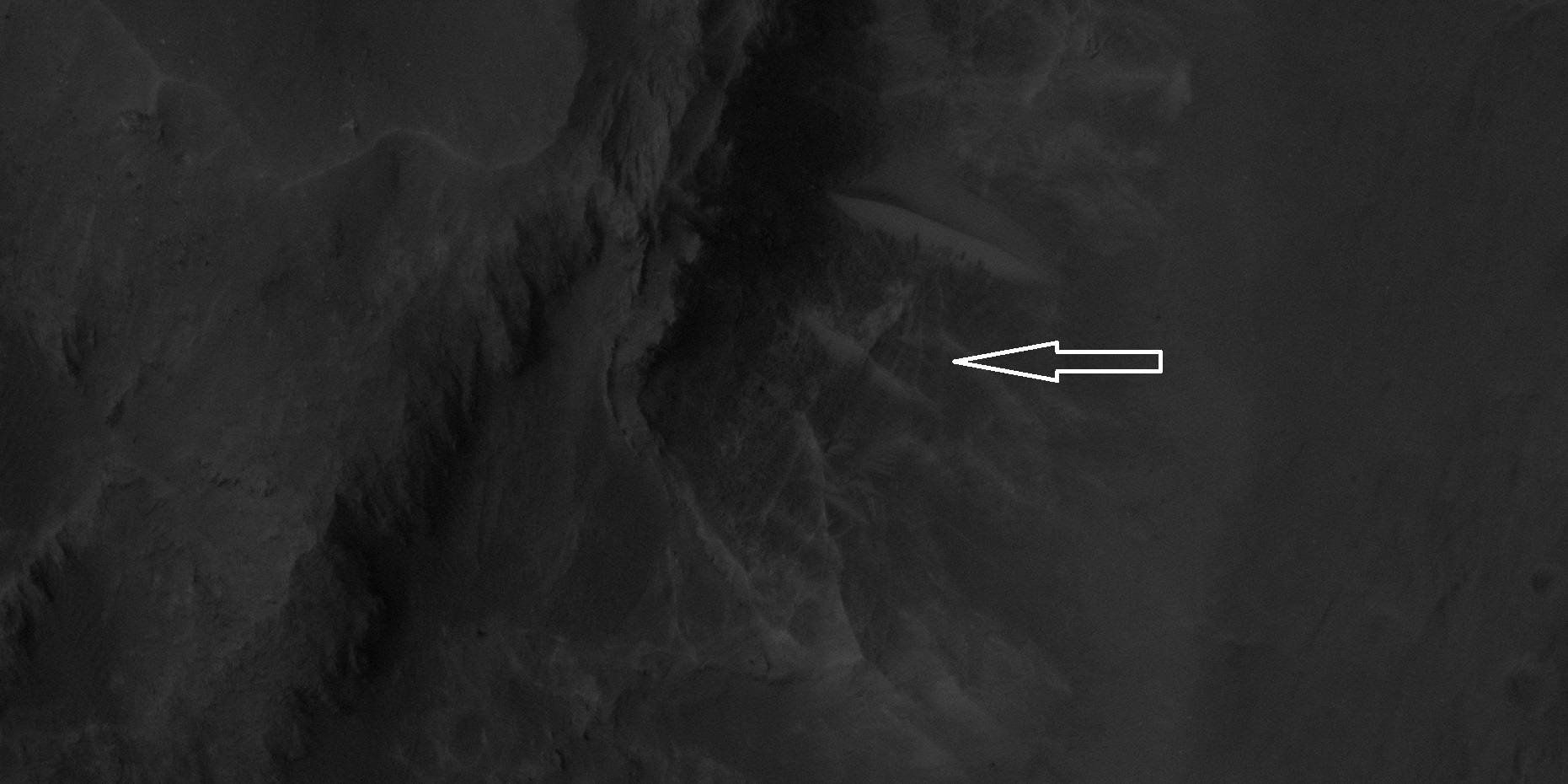
Close view of ridges from previous HiRISE image Arrow indicates an X-shaped ridge.

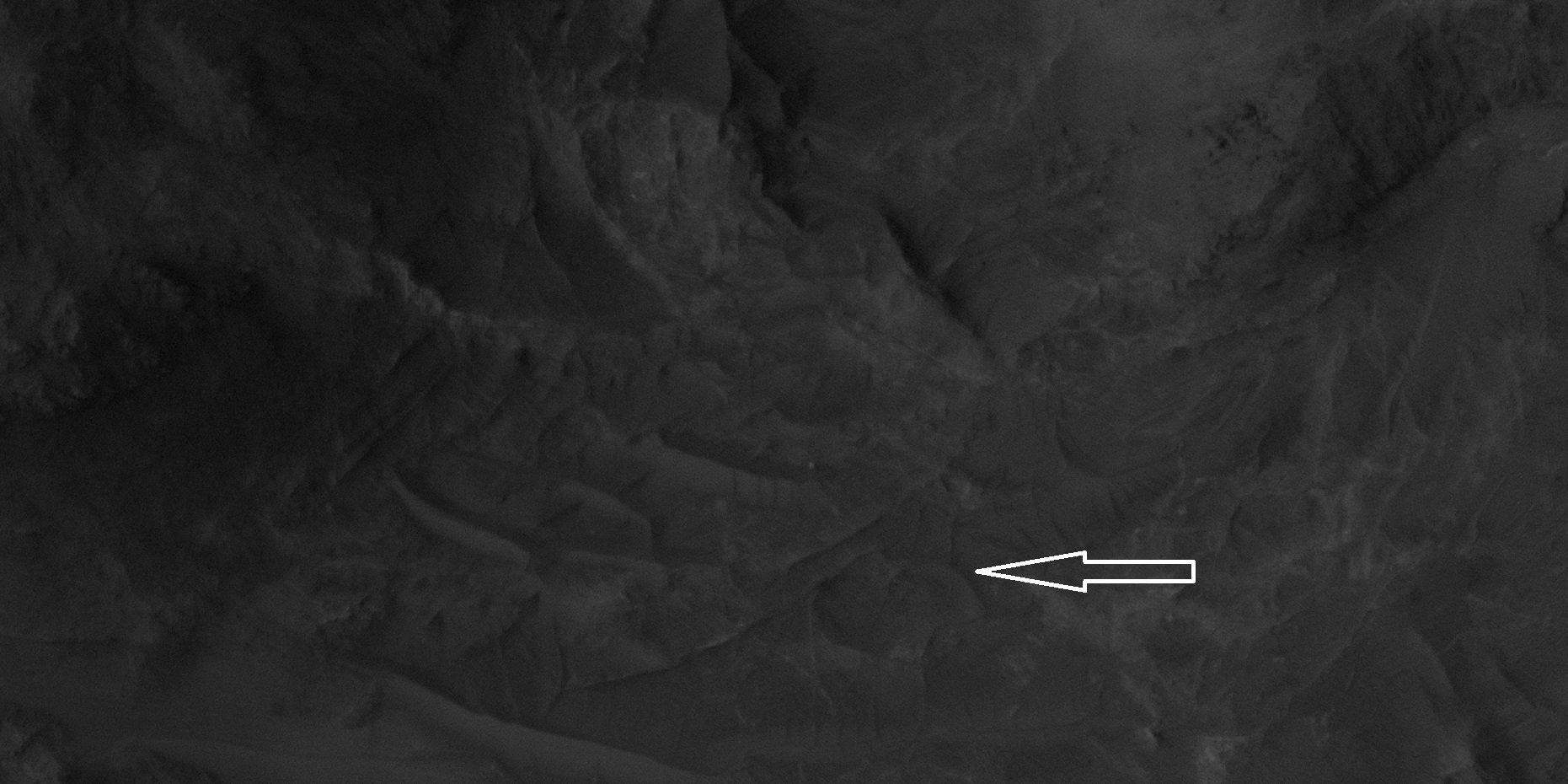
Close view of the central section of Auki Crater showing ridges with arrow Image is an enlargement of a previous HiRISE image.

The surface of Mars contains abundant evidence of a wetter climate in the past along with ice frozen in the ground today; therefore it is quite possible that hydrothermal systems could be set up from impact heat. NASA's Mars Odyssey actually measured the distribution of ice from orbit with a gamma ray spectrometer. So, in the past, much water could have been available to circulate in cracks and deposit new minerals. This process, called hydrothermal alteration has been found in a meteorite from Mars. Research, published in February 2011, detailed the discovery of clay minerals, serpentine, and carbonate in the veins of a Nakhlite martian meteorite. The Phoenix lander, whose rocket engine blast actually exposed a layer of ice, watched ice melt (the ice disappeared by sublimation).

Because 30% of the roughly 180 impact craters on Earth contain minerals or oil and gas, it seems that the cratering promotes the development of natural resources Some of the ores produced from impact-related effects on Earth include ores of iron, uranium, gold, copper, and nickel. It is estimated that the value of materials mined from impact structures is 5 billion dollars/year just for North America.

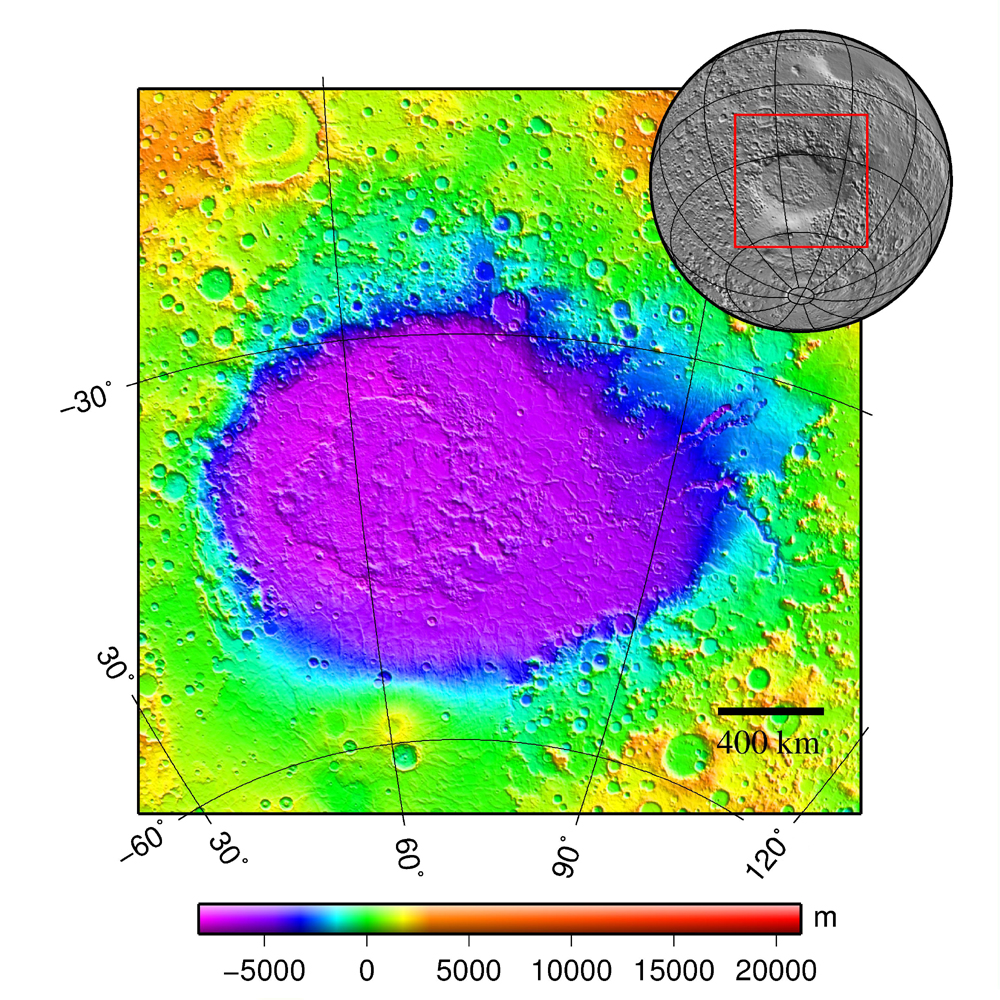
Hellas Basin Area topography. This is one of the impacts that would have taken many thousands of years to cool. A lot of minerals could have been deposited while this area was cooling.

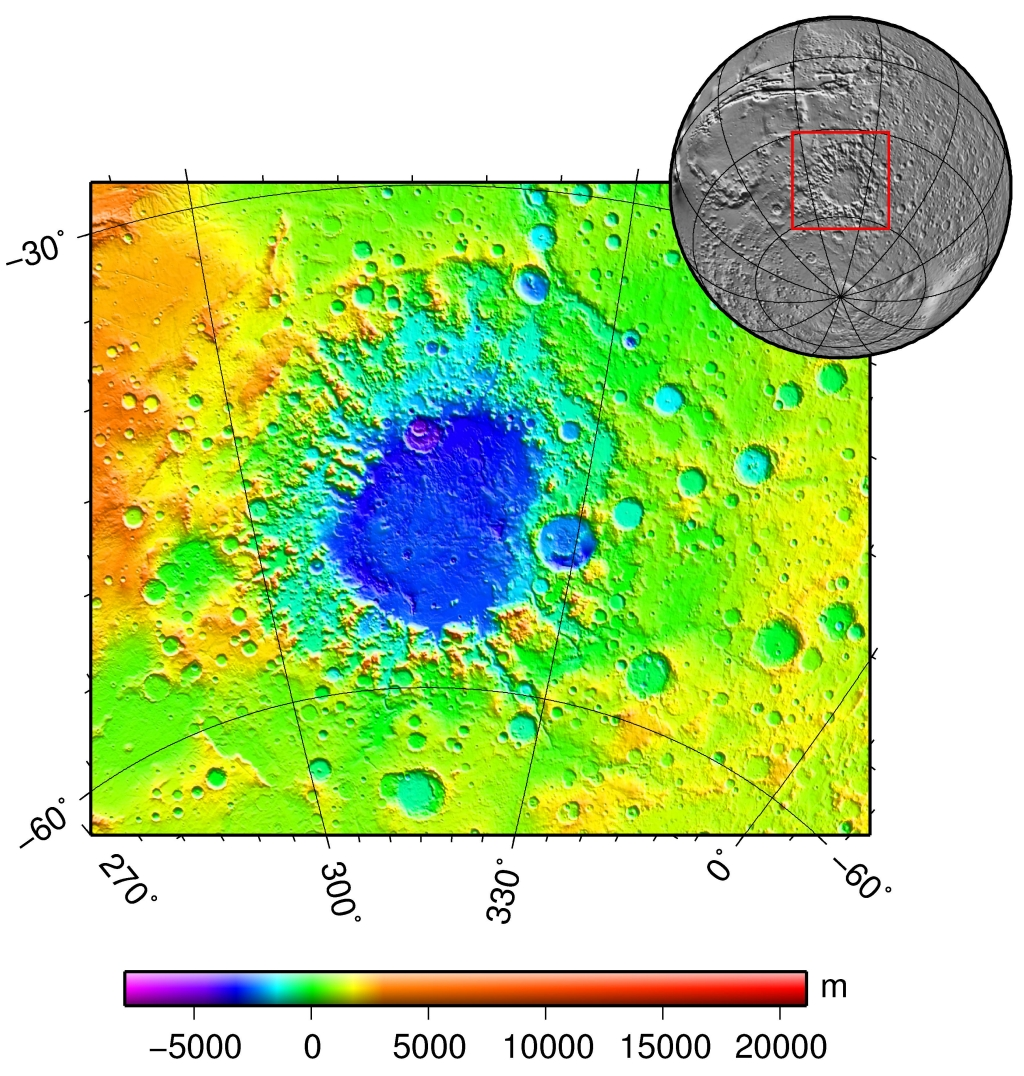
Topography of the Argyre Basin, the major feature in the Argyre quadrangle. This large impact crater would have also taken many thousands of years to cool.

== Direct evidence for useful materials ==
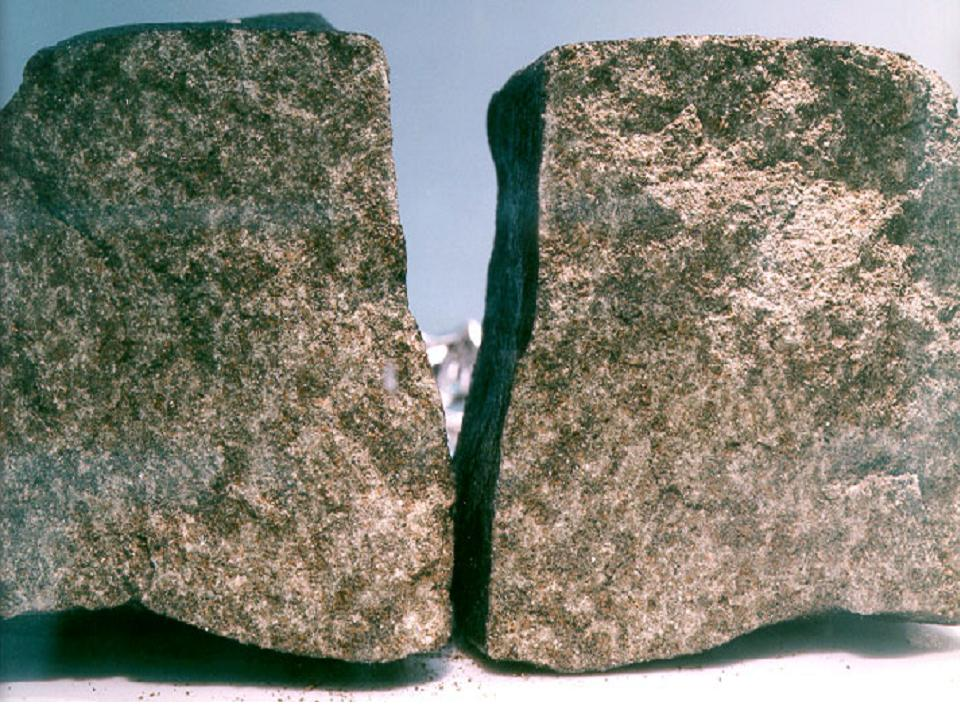
Nakhla meteorite, one of many pieces of Mars that have landed on the Earth. Visible are its two sides and its inner surfaces after breaking it in 1998.

It has for some time been accepted by the scientific community that a group of meteorites came from Mars. As such, they represent actual samples of the planet and have been analyzed on Earth by the best equipment available. In these meteorites, called SNCs, many important elements have been detected. Magnesium, aluminium, titanium, iron, and chromium are relatively common in them. In addition, lithium, cobalt, nickel, copper, zinc, niobium, molybdenum, lanthanum, europium, tungsten, and gold have been found in trace amounts. It is quite possible that in some places these materials may be concentrated enough to be mined economically.

The Mars landers Viking I, Viking II, Pathfinder, Opportunity rover, and Spirit rover identified aluminium, iron, magnesium, and titanium in the Martian soil. Opportunity found small structures, named "blueberries" which were found to be rich in hematite, a major ore of iron. These blueberries could easily be gathered up and reduced to metallic iron that could be used to make steel.

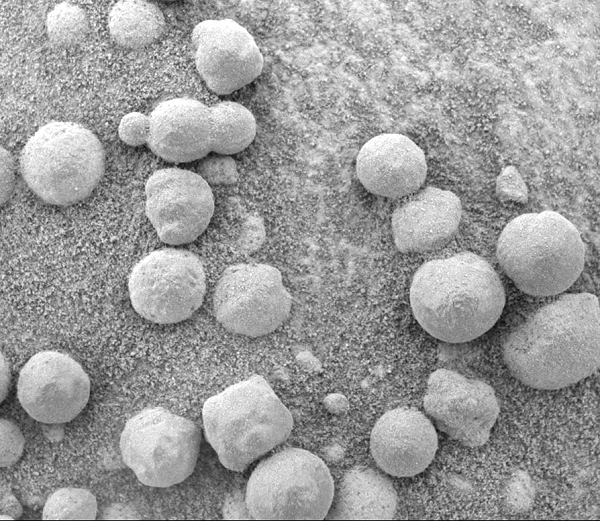
"Blueberries" (hematite spheres) on a rocky outcrop at Eagle Crater. Note the merged triplet in the upper left.

In addition, both Spirit and Opportunity rovers found nickel-iron meteorites sitting on the surface of Mars. These could also be used to produce steel.

In December 2011, Opportunity rover discovered a vein of gypsum sticking out of the soil. Tests confirmed that it contained calcium, sulfur, and water. The mineral gypsum is the best match for the data. It likely formed from mineral-rich water moving through a crack in the rock. The vein, called "Homestake," is in Mars' Meridiani plain. Homestake is in a zone where the sulfate-rich sedimentary bedrock of the plains meets older, volcanic bedrock exposed at the rim of Endeavour crater.

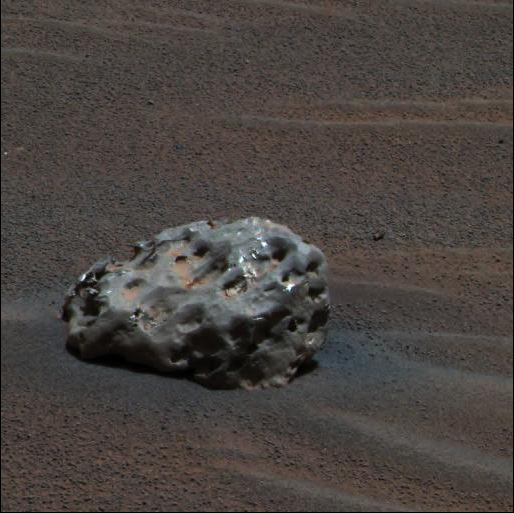
Heat Shield Rock was the first meteorite ever identified on another planet. It is 93% iron.

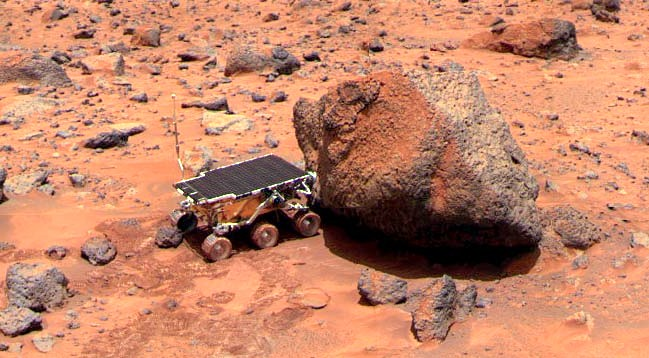
Pathfinder's Souourner rover is taking its Alpha Proton X-ray Spectrometer measurement of the Yogi Rock (NASA). This instrument measured the elements in the rock.

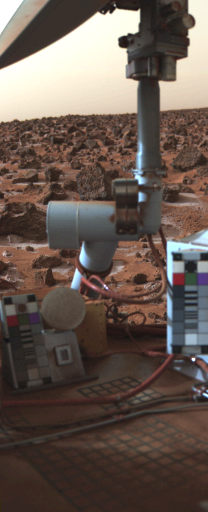
Viking lander took this picture of the Martian surface and analyzed the soil.

Dark sand dunes are common on the surface of Mars. Their dark tone is due to the volcanic rock called basalt. The basalt dunes are believed to contain the minerals chromite, magnetite, and ilmenite. Since the wind has gathered them together, they do not even have to be mined, merely scooped up. These minerals could supply future colonists with chromium, iron, and titanium.

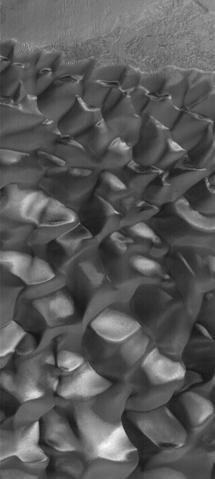
Dark dunes (probably basalt) which form a dark spot in Noachis quadrangle. Picture from Mars Global Surveyor.

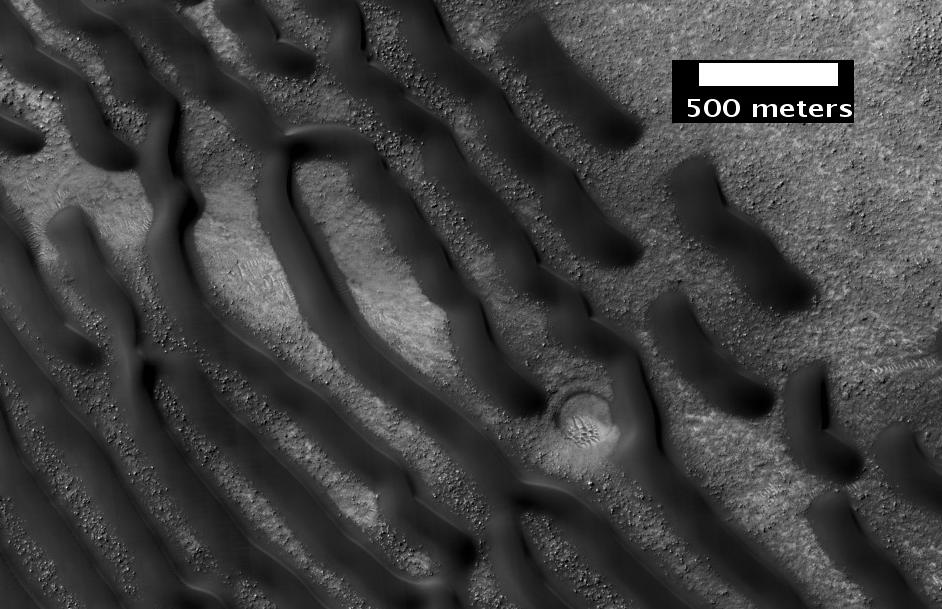
Wide view of dunes in Noachis, as seen by HiRISE

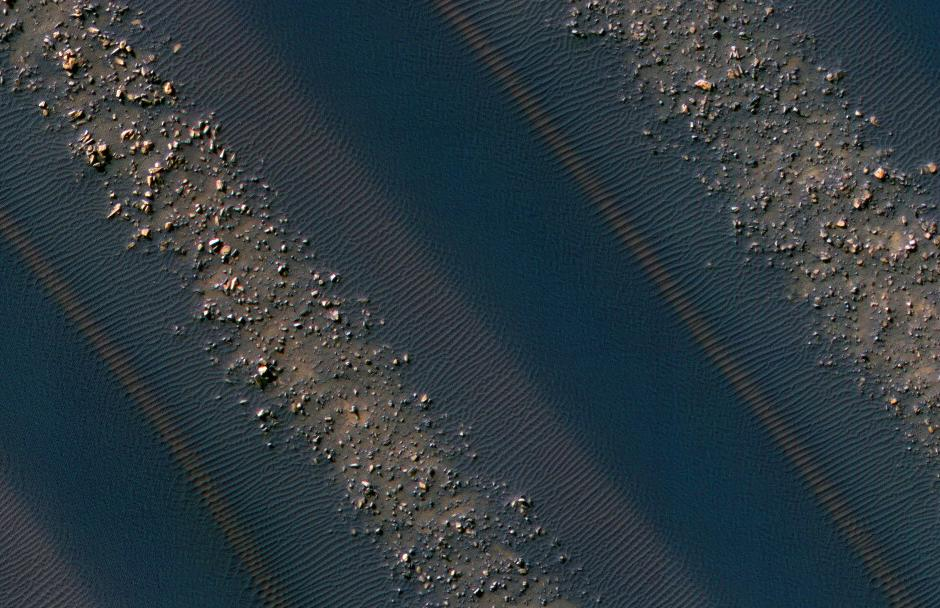
Close-up View of dunes in the previous image, as seen by HiRISE. Note how sand barely covers some boulders.

== Future detection for ores on Mars ==
Theoretically, ore resources exist on Mars. Moreover, sensitive equipment can predict where to look for them, such as around craters and near volcanic regions. As more images are gathered, more information will be gathered which will help to better map the locations of smaller structures, such as dikes, that indicate intrusive (under the surface) igneous activity. Later, flying uncrewed craft with gravity and magnetic measuring devices will be able to determine the exact locations of mineral deposits.

== See also ==
- Asteroid belt – Region between the orbits of Mars and Jupiter
- Auki Crater – Crater on Mars
- Composition of Mars – Branch of the geology of Mars
- Dike (geology) – Sheet of rock that is formed in a fracture of a pre-existing rock body
- Geology of Mars – Geology of fourth planet from the Sun
- Impact crater – Circular depression in a solid astronomical body formed by the impact of a smaller object
- Impact event – Collision of two astronomical objects
- Linear ridge networks
- Mineralogy of Mars
- Water on Mars – Study of past and present water on Mars
