= Rahe (crater) =

Martian geographical feature

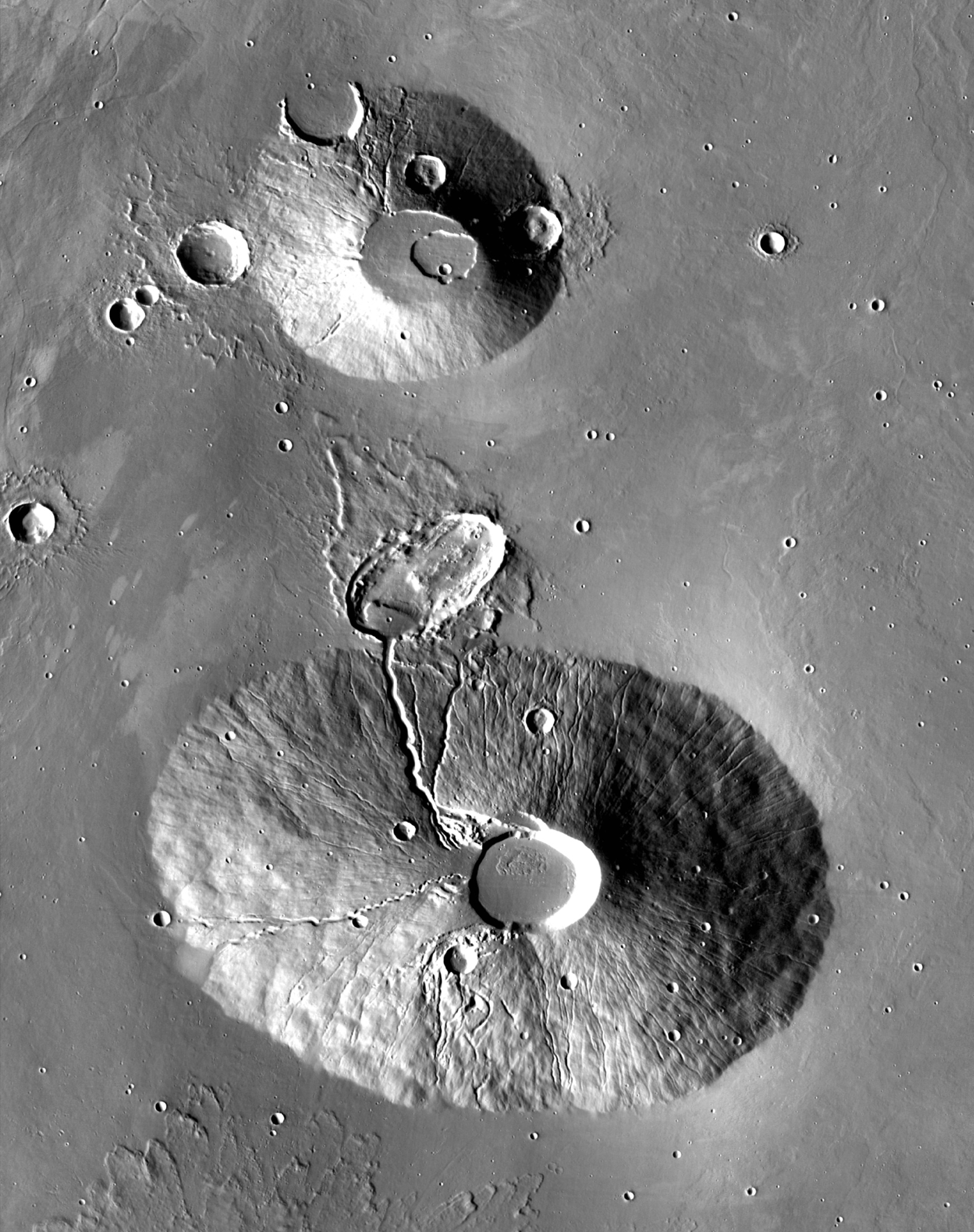
- 2001 Mars Odyssey THEMIS mosaic showing Ceraunius Tholus (below) and Uranius Tholus (above). Rahe crater is at the center.
- Feature type: crater
- Coordinates: 25.05°N 262.52°E
- Dimensions: 34.44 km
- Naming: Jürgen Rahe

Rahe is a crater on the planet Mars in the Tharsis quadrangle, positioned at 25.05° north latitude and 262.52° east longitude, between the volcanoes Ceraunius Tholus and Uranius Tholus. It measures approximately 34 kilometers in diameter and was named after Jürgen Rahe, a German-American astronomer and NASA science program director.

== Description ==
The crater has an elongated shape measuring 35 km by 18 km and is the result of an oblique impact. A channel connects Rahe crater to the vicinity of the summit caldera of Ceraunius Tholus, with an interesting fan-shaped deposit at the lower end.

Rahe crater is 1 km deep in places, and was created by a low angle impact which is evident by its elongated shape and ejecta deposit in the shape of a "butterfly". Rahe is believed to once have held a lake. The lake was formed because heat from the nearby volcano Ceraunius Tholus melted glaciers. Melt water first collected in the caldera of Cerunius Tholus, and then spilled over the caldera rim forming a valley and the lake in Rahe crater. The valley that carried the water was about 200 m wide. A delta formed where the valley entered the crater.

This type of event involving volcanic heat melting glaciers is common in Iceland. Eruptions under glaciers are called jökulhlaups and average two each century. Studies of climate change show that many low-latitude regions accumulated large amounts of snow when the climate was different.

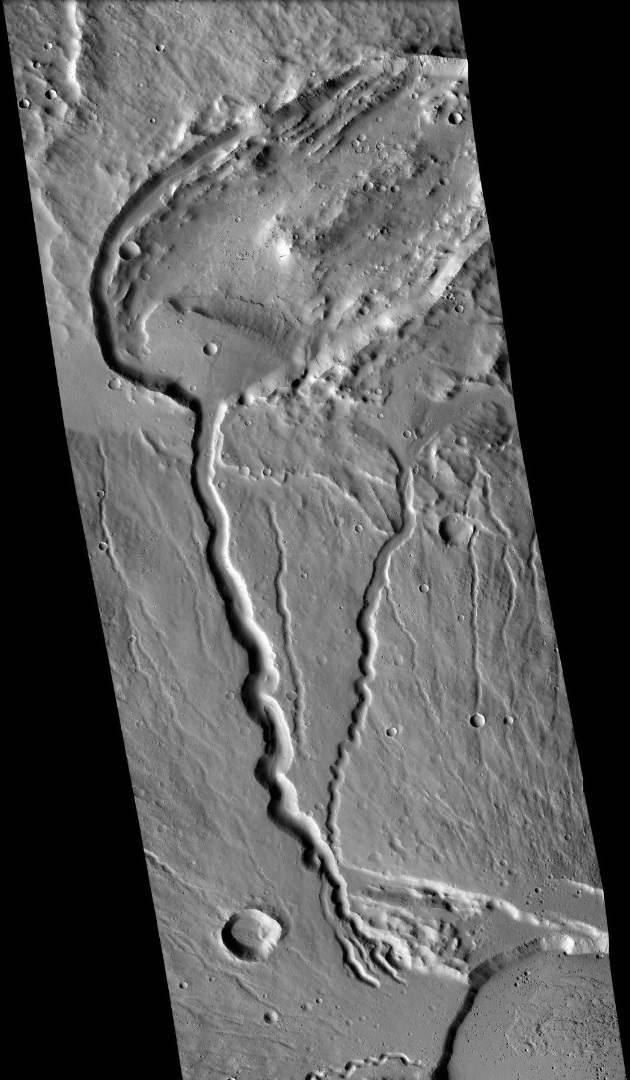
Rahe crater, as seen by CTX camera (on MRO).

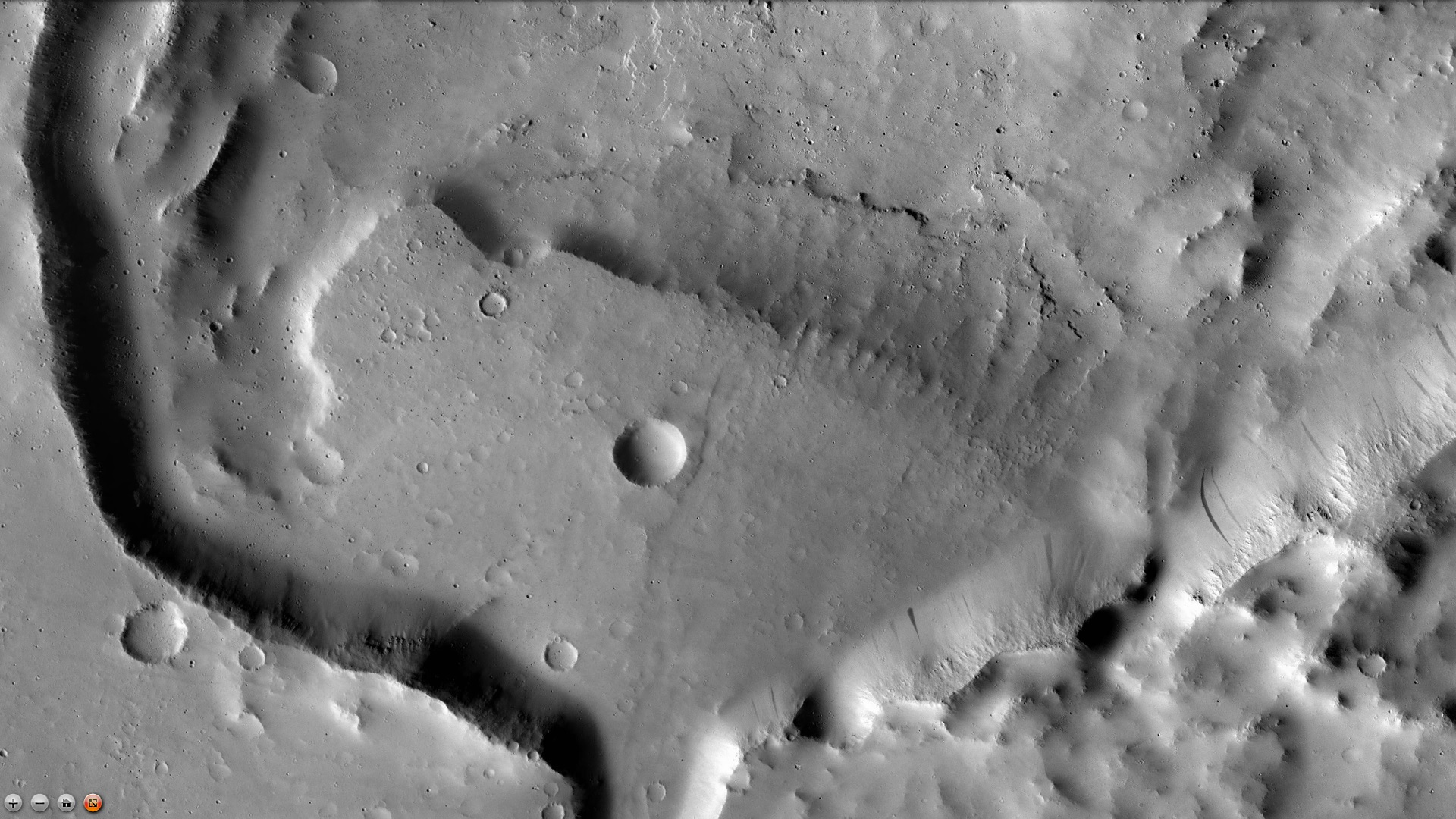
Delta in Rahe crater, as seen by CTX camera. Note: this is an enlargement from the previous image of Rahe Crater.

== See also ==
- Climate of Mars
- Geology of Mars
- 3537 Jürgen § Naming, minor planet
- List of craters on Mars
