= Uranius group of volcanoes =

Located on planet Mars

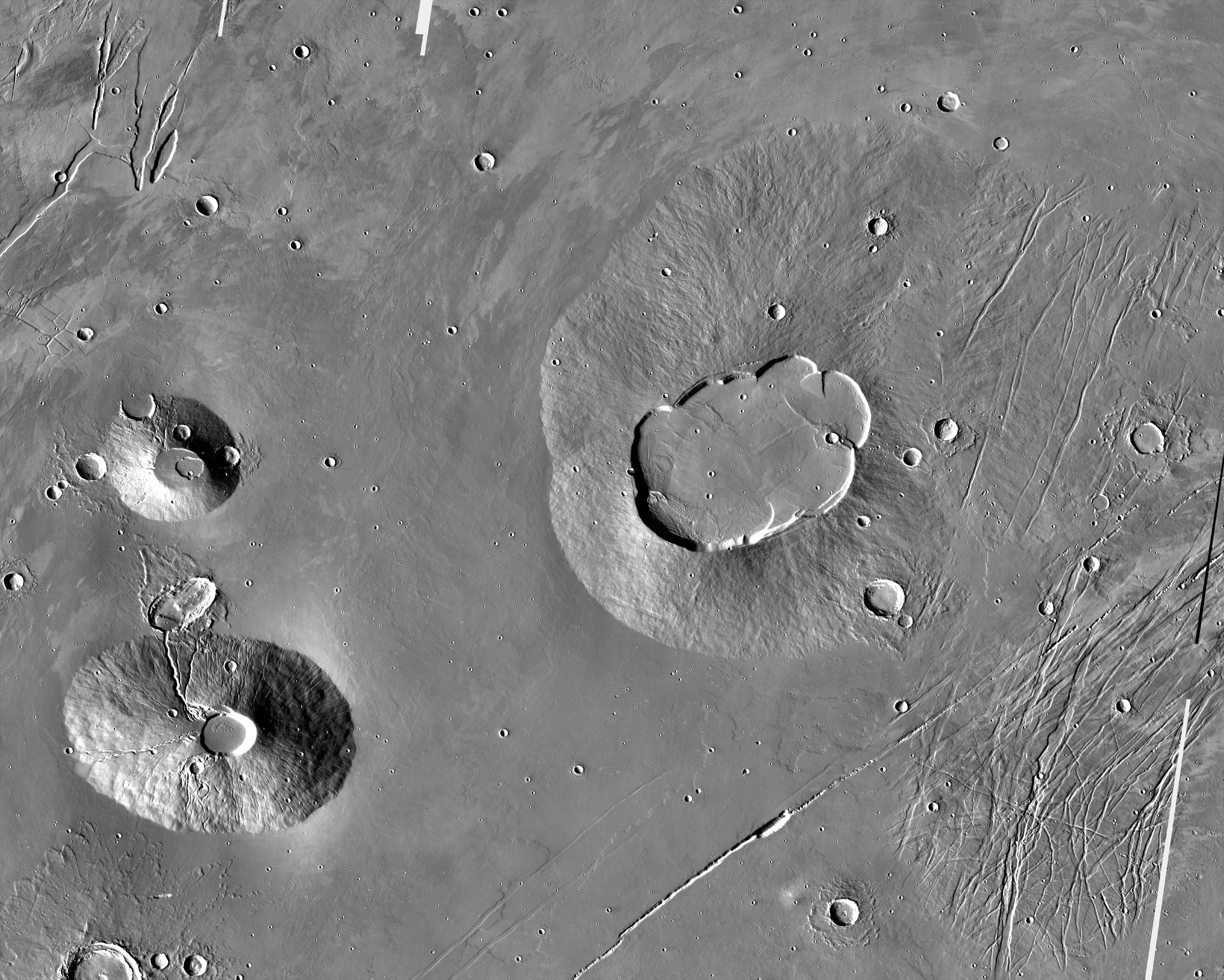
2001 Mars Odyssey THEMIS mosaic of the Uranius group of volcanoes: Ceraunius Tholus (bottom left), Uranius Tholus (center left), and Uranius Mons (upper right). The horizontal scale of the image is about 550 km.

The Uranius group of volcanoes is located on planet Mars in the northeast part of Tharsis and includes Uranius Mons, Ceraunius Tholus, and Uranius Tholus. Along with the Tharsis Montes to the southwest, they form part of a linear chain of volcanoes in the Tharsis region.

They are dated to the Late Hesperian Epoch and are part of earliest phases of volcanism in the Tharsis province. All three volcanoes are interpreted as basaltic shields. The volcanoes of the Uranius group were active for short periods of time (10 000–100 000 years) and are significantly older than the major Tharsis volcanoes.
