= Uranius Mons =

Martian volcano

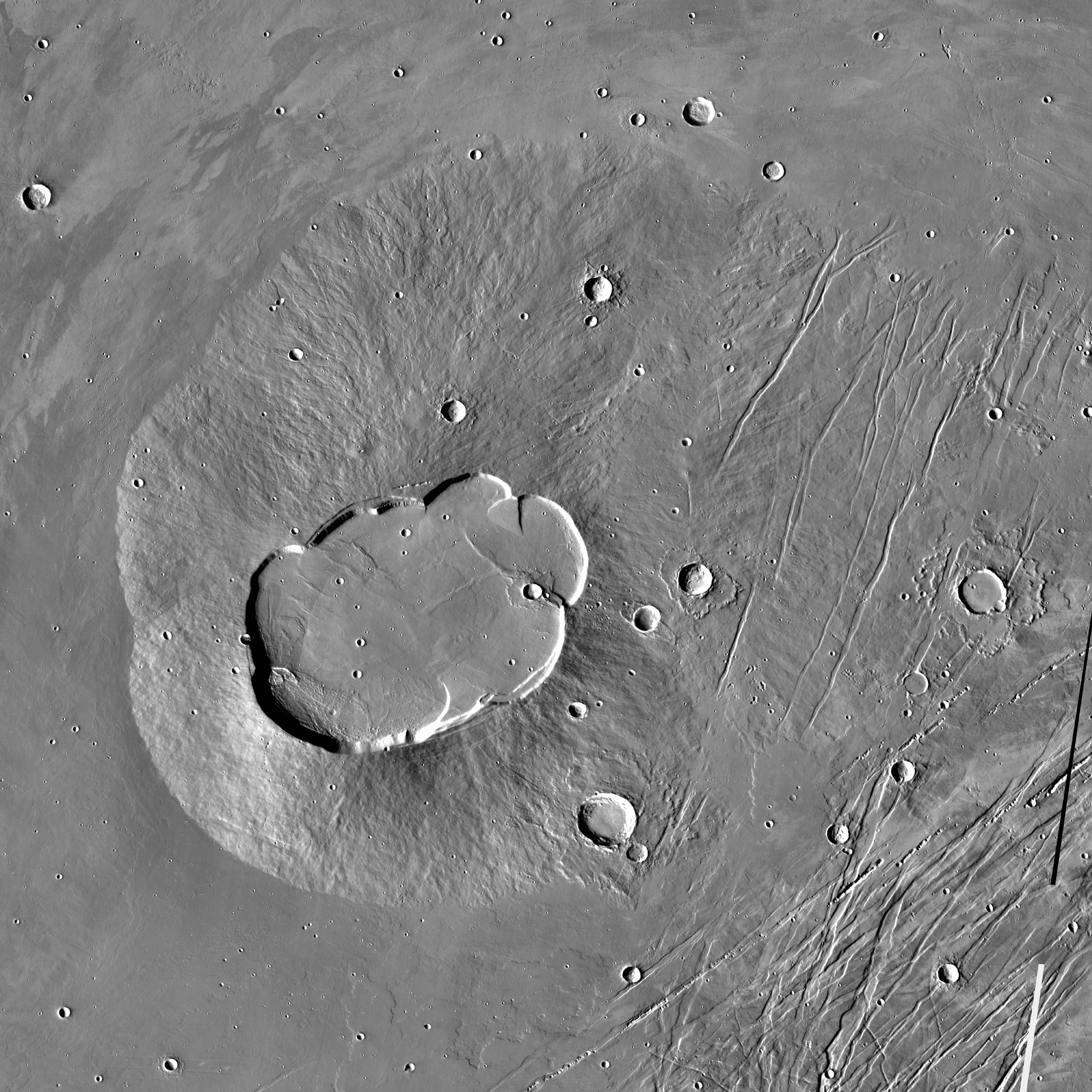
- 2001 Mars Odyssey THEMIS mosaic of Uranius Mons
- Feature type: mountain
- Coordinates: 26.90°N 267.85°E
- Peak: 4,853 metres (15,922 ft)

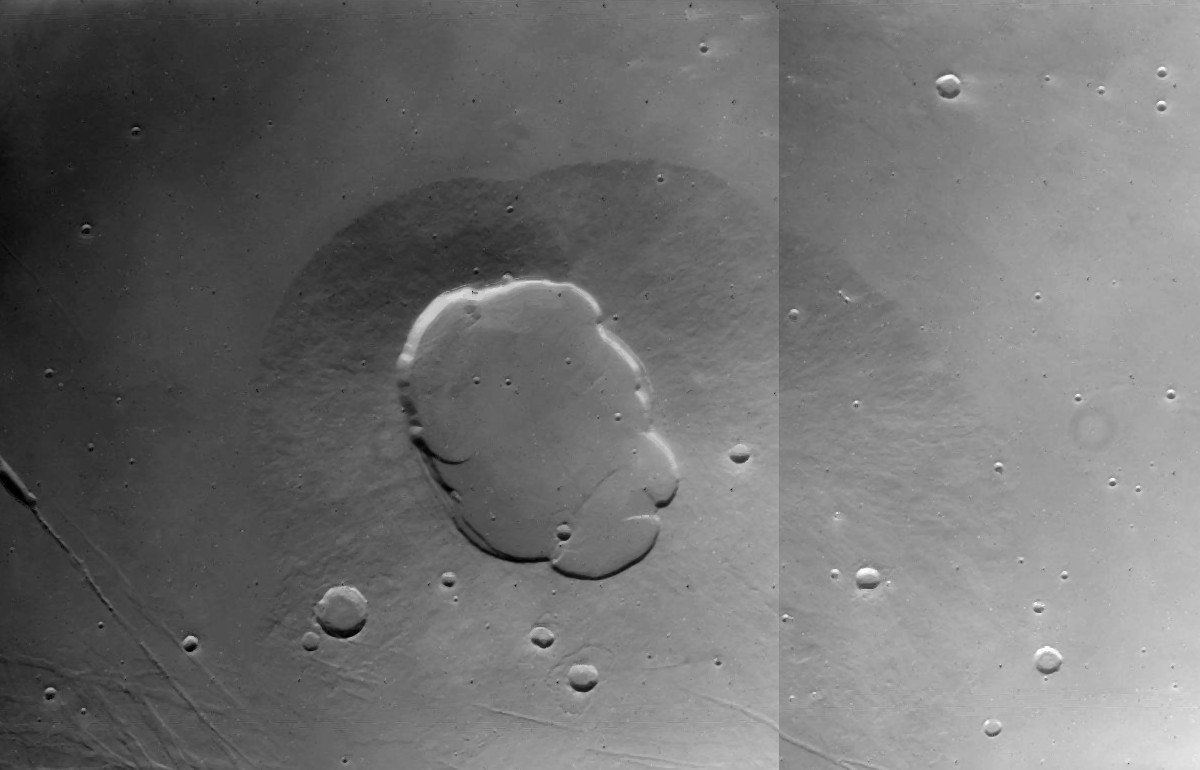
Viking Orbiter 1 mosaic

Uranius Mons, formerly Uranius Patera, is a volcano on Mars located in the Tharsis quadrangle, named after a classical albedo feature. The name "Uranius Patera" now refers only to the volcano's central caldera. It is 4,853 metres (15,922 ft) high and has shallow slopes. It belongs to the Uranius group of volcanoes in the Tharsis area. The sides of Uranius Mons consist of radial lava flows; the large caldera (90×65 km) is elongated in the southwestern direction. The surrounding plains are younger and part of the Tharsis Montes Formation of the Amazonian epoch.
