= Ceraunius Tholus =

Martian volcano

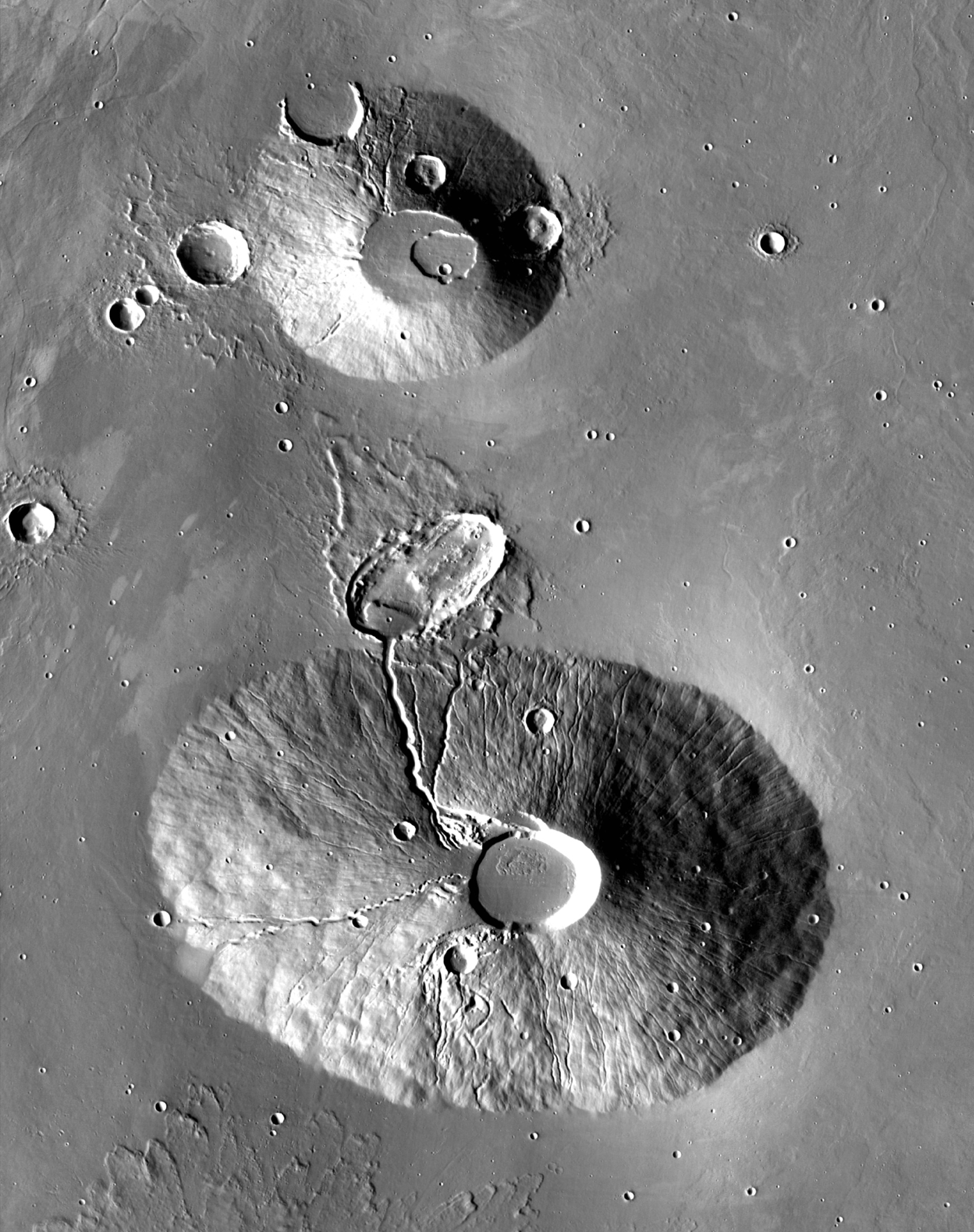
- 2001 Mars Odyssey THEMIS mosaic of Ceraunius Tholus (lower volcano) and Uranius Tholus (upper volcano).
- Feature type: mountain
- Coordinates: 24.25°N 262.75°E
- Peak: ~8,500 metres (27,887 ft)

Ceraunius Tholus is a volcano on Mars located in the Tharsis quadrangle at 24.25° north latitude and 262.75° east longitude, part of the Uranius group of volcanoes. It is 130 kilometres (81 mi) across, approximately 8,500 metres (27,887 ft) high and is named after a classical albedo feature name.

It is generally believed to be a basaltic shield with the lower part buried beneath plain forming lavas. Earlier interpretations suggested that it is a stratovolcano. The slopes on Ceraunius Tholus are quite steep with an average slope of 8° with many radial erosion channels and pitted valleys extending from just below the rim of the caldera toward the base of the volcano. The current view is that the valleys were eroded by water. Interesting features on Ceraunius Tholus are three large canyons at the northwest flank of Ceraunius Tholus which are up to 2.5 km wide and 300 m deep. The biggest of these three also appears to be the youngest and protrude from the lowest point of the volcanic caldera and ends at the interesting crater Rahe (an oblique impact crater with measures of 35 × 18 km), just north from the volcano where it formed a depositional fan. Its origin is still debatable and there are four main models proposed: fluvial action, volcanic flows, valley being a lava channel or some combination of previously mentioned models.

Ceraunius appears small compared to other larger volcanoes, but it is almost as tall as Earth's Mount Everest.

The caldera of Ceranius Tholus is also dotted with many collapse pits, which are distinct from impact craters as they have no rim and vary in abundance across the caldera. Ceraunius Tholus is probably late Hesperian in age.

The crater Paros lies south of Ceraunius Tholus, and the elongate crater Rahe is to the north.

== Glaciers ==
Some scientists believe that glaciers may have existed on many of the volcanoes in Tharsis including Olympus Mons, Ascraeus Mons, and Pavonis Mons. A study analysing data gathered over Ceraunius Tholus by the Mars Orbiter Laser Altimeter concluded that there was likely to have been a period of significant snow and ice accumulation, and that snowmelt may have contributed to valley formation on Ceraunius Tholus, as well as the formation of a caldera lake. A subsequent study utilising high-resolution colour imagery from the Colour and Stereo Surface Imaging System onboard the ESA Trace Gas Orbiter found evidence of periodic frost formation on Ceraunius Tholus.

== Environment around Ceraunius Tholus ==
Ceraunius Tholus is on the Tharsis rise, also called the Tharsis bulge. Tharsis is a land of great volcanoes. Olympus Mons is the tallest known volcano. Ascraeus Mons and Pavonis Mons are at least 320 km across and are over 10 km above the plateau that they sit on. The plateau is five to four seven kilometers above the zero altitude of Mars.

Map of Tharsis quadrangle with major features indicated. Tharsis contains many volcanoes, including Olympus Mons, the tallest known volcano in the Solar System.

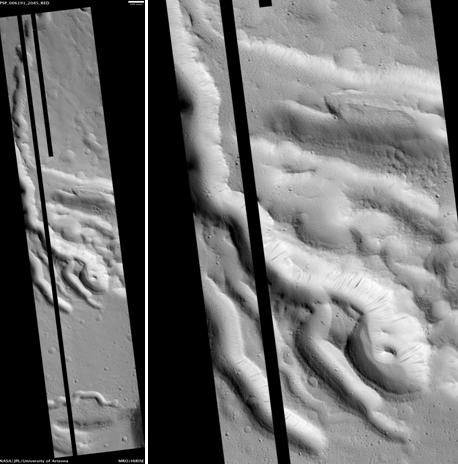
Ceraunius Tholus Channel, as seen by HiRISE. The summit crater of Ceraunius Tholus is just to the right of this picture. Click on image to see dark slope streaks. The scale bar is 1000 meters long.

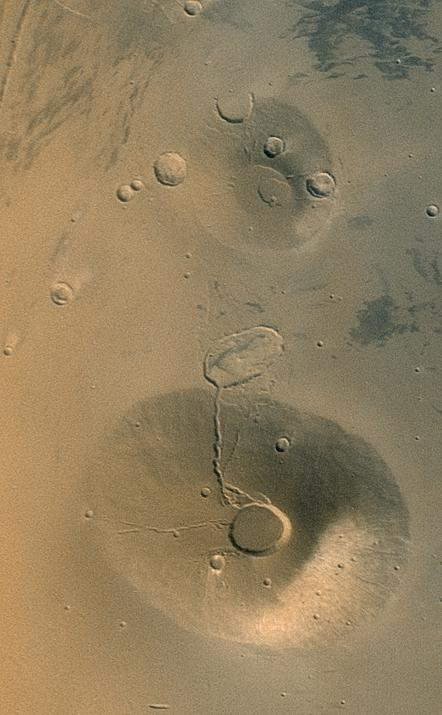
View of Ceraunius Tholus and Uranius Tholus from the Mars Orbiter Camera of Mars Global Surveyor.

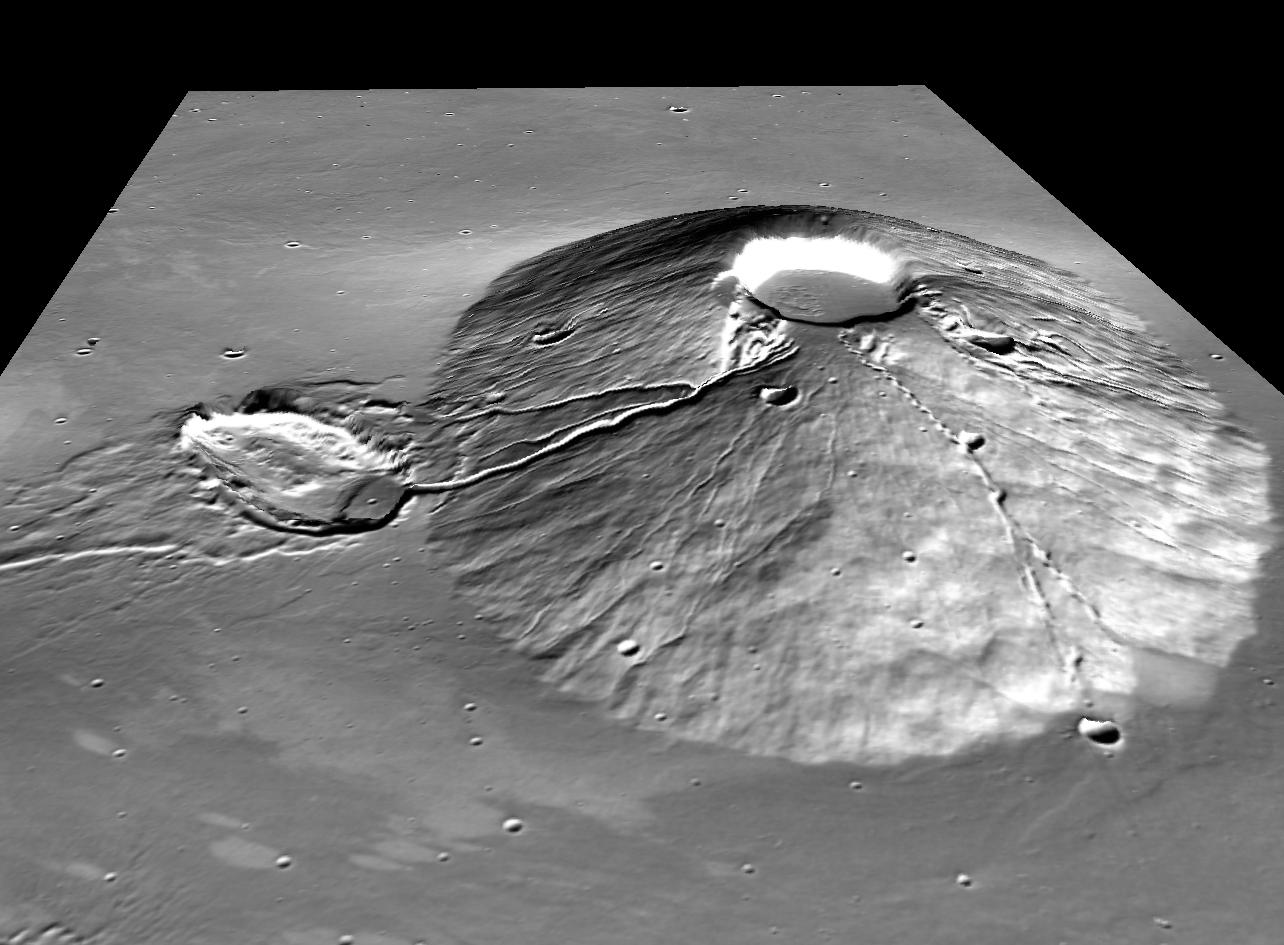
Computer-generated 3D view of Ceraunius Tholus with 5x vertical exaggeration. The image was obtained from THEMIS coverage plus MOLA altimetry. The crater Rahe is at left.

== See also ==
- Geography of Mars
- Geology of Mars
- Glaciers on Mars
- HiRISE
- List of mountains on Mars by height
- Volcanoes on Mars
- Volcanology of Mars
