= Uranius Tholus =

Martian volcano

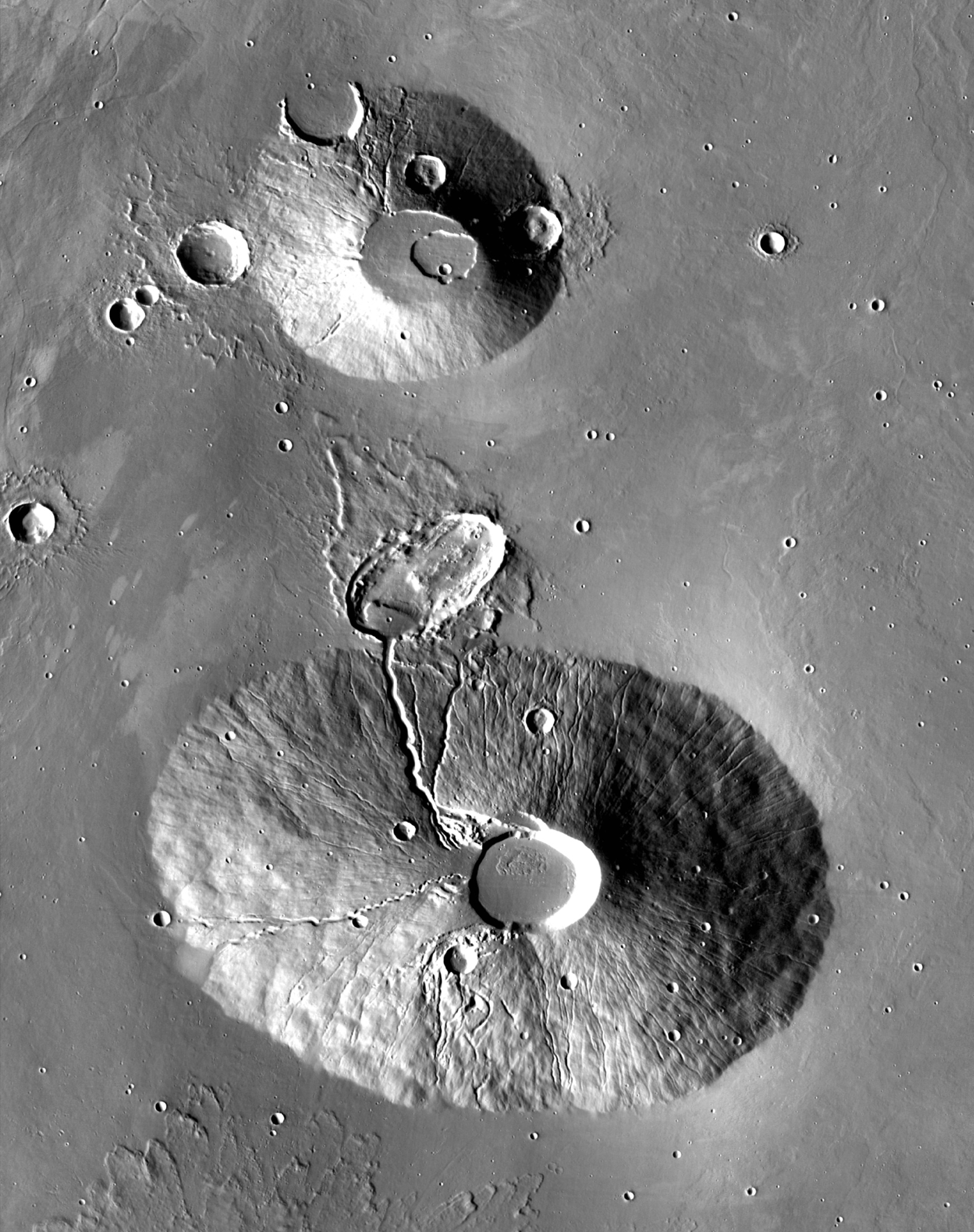
- 2001 Mars Odyssey THEMIS mosaic of Uranius Tholus (upper volcano) and Ceraunius Tholus (lower volcano).
- Feature type: mountain
- Coordinates: 26.52°N 262.43°E
- Peak: 4,290 metres (14,075 ft)

Uranius Tholus is a volcano on Mars located in the Tharsis quadrangle at 26.52° north latitude and 262.43° east longitude. It is 61.4 kilometres (38 mi) across with an elevation of 4,290 metres (14,075 ft) and was named after a classical albedo feature name.

Uranius Tholus is part of the Uranius group of volcanoes and lies north of the larger Ceraunius Tholus.
