= Ophir Chasma =

Canyon on Mars

- Ophir Chasma based on THEMIS mosaic
- Coordinates: 4°S 72.5°W

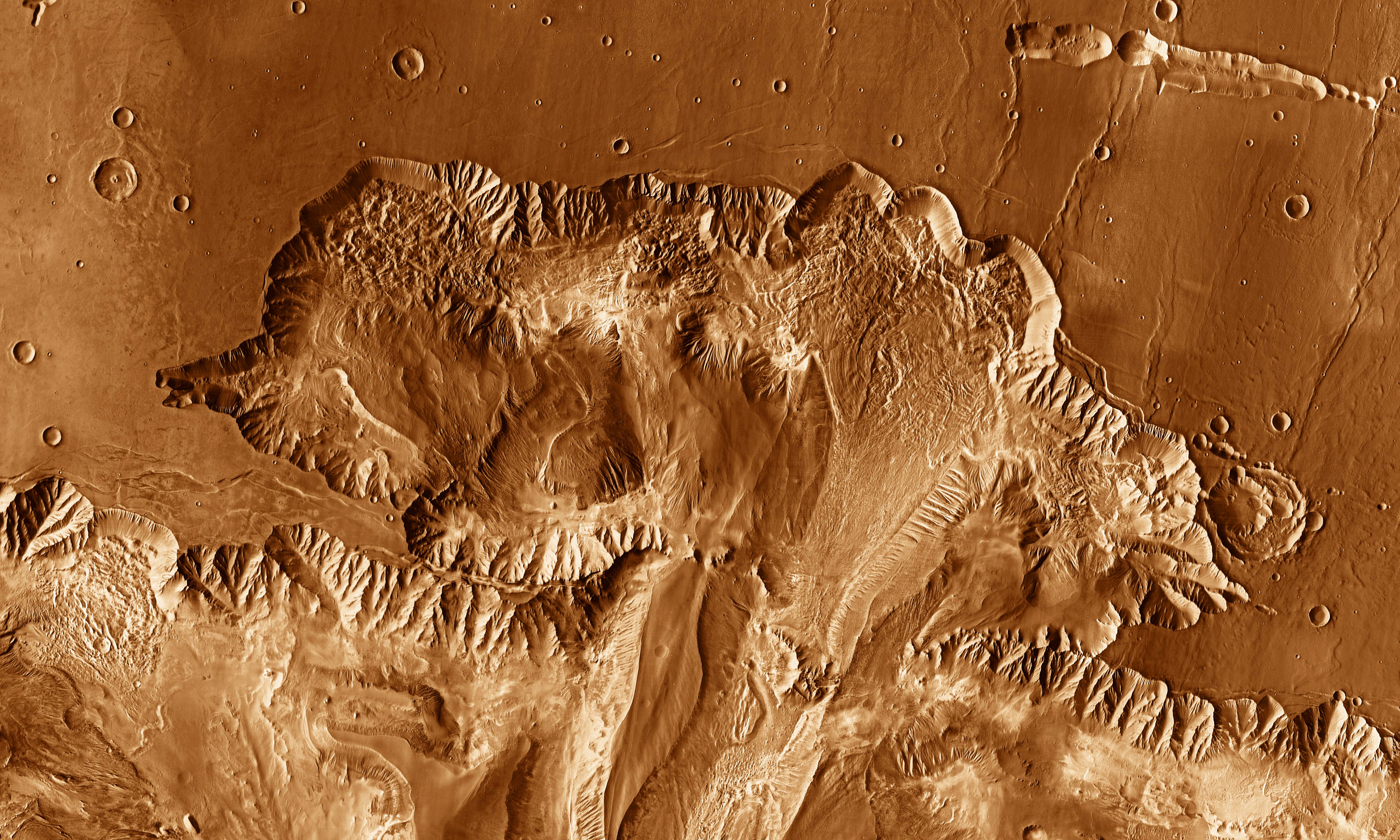
Ophir Chasma in mosaic of THEMIS infrared images, with part of Candor Chasma at bottom

Ophir Chasma /ˈoʊfər ˈkæzmə/ is a canyon in the Coprates quadrangle of Mars at 4° south latitude and 72.5° west longitude. It is about 317 km long and was named after Ophir, a land mentioned in the Bible. In the Bible it was the land which King Solomon sent an expedition that returned with gold. It is a classical albedo feature name.

== Valles Marineris canyon system ==
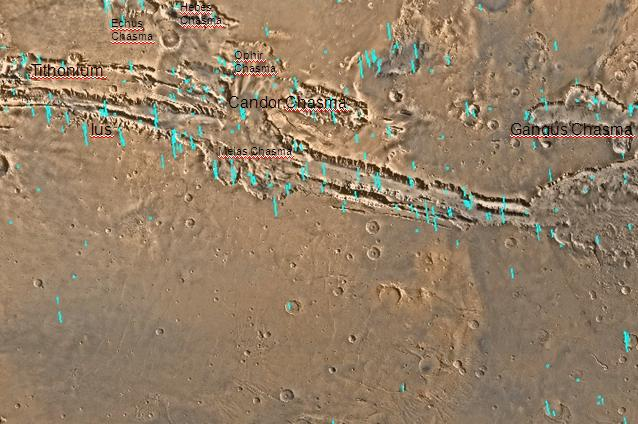
Map of Coprates quadrangle showing details of Valles Marineris, the largest canyon system in the Solar System. Some of the canyons may have once been filled with water.

Ophir Chasma is part of the largest canyon system in the solar system; this great canyon would go almost all the way across the United States. The name for the whole system of canyons is Valles Marineris. Starting at the west with Noctis Labyrinthus in the Phoenicis Lacus quadrangle, the canyon system ends in the Margaritifer Sinus quadrangle with Capri Chasma and Eos Chasma (in the south). The word chasma has been designated by the International Astronomical Union to refer to an elongate, steep-sided depression. Valles Marineris was discovered by and named for the Mariner 9 mission. Moving east from Noctis Labyrinthus, the canyon splits into two parallel troughs, Tithonium Chasma to the North and Ius Chasma to the south. In the middle of the system are very wide valleys of Ophir Chasma (north), Candor Chasma, and Melas Chasma (south). Going farther to the east, one comes to Coprates Chasma. At the end of Coprates Chasma, the valley gets wider to form Capri Chasma in the north and Eos Chasma in the south. The walls of the canyons often contain many layers. The floors of some of the canyons contain large deposits of layered materials. Some researchers believe that the layers were formed when water once filled the canyons. The canyons are deep as well as long. In places they are 8-10 kilometers deep. In comparison, Earth's Grand Canyon is 1.6 kilometers deep.

== Layers ==
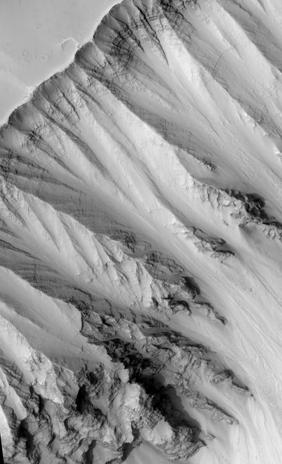
Ophir Chasma wall, as seen by HiRISE.

Images of rocks in the canyon walls almost always show layers. Some layers appear tougher than others. In the image below of Ganges Chasma Layers, as seen by HiRISE, one can see that the upper, light-toned deposits are eroding much faster than the lower darker layers. Some cliffs on Mars show a few darker layers standing out and often breaking into large pieces; these are thought to be hard volcanic rock instead of soft ash deposits. Because of its closeness to the Tharsis volcanic region, the rock layers may be made of layer after layer of lava flows, probably mixed with deposits of volcanic ash that fell out of the air following big eruptions. It is likely the rock strata in the walls preserve a long geological history of Mars. Dark layers may be due to dark lava flows. The dark volcanic rock basalt is common on Mars. However, light-toned deposits may have resulted from rivers, lakes, volcanic ash, or wind blown deposits of sand or dust. The Mars Rovers found light-toned rocks to contain sulfates. Probably having been formed in water, sulfate deposits are of great interest to scientists because they may contain traces of ancient life.

== Gallery ==
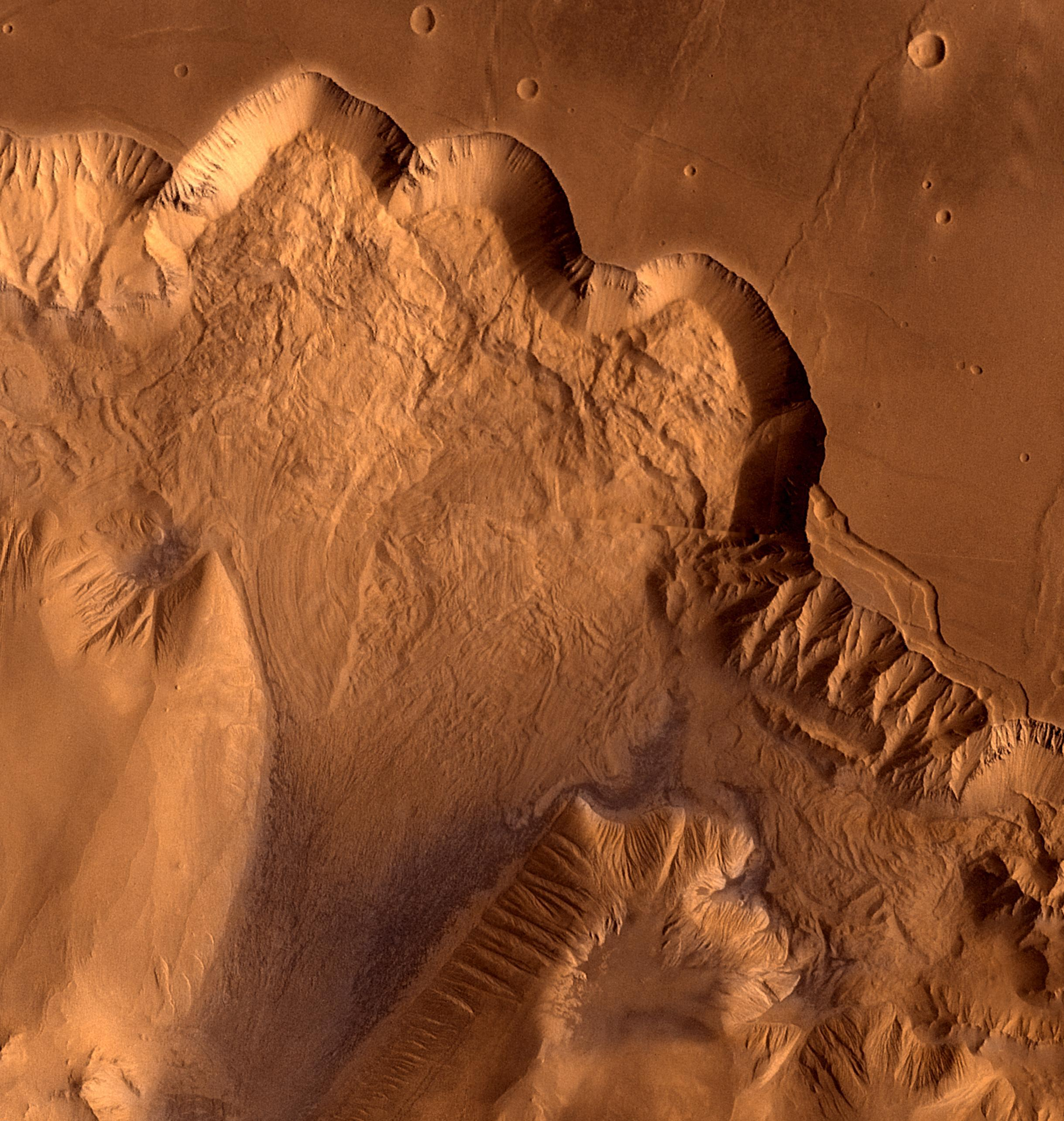
Synthetic oblique view of Ophir Chasma from Viking orbiter images.

On August 19, 2015, ISRO released the 3D portrayals of Ophir Chasma taken by Mars Orbiter Mission.

== See also ==
- Chasma
- Climate on Mars
- Geology of Mars
- HiRISE
- Tectonics of Mars
