= Ius Chasma =

Canyon on Mars

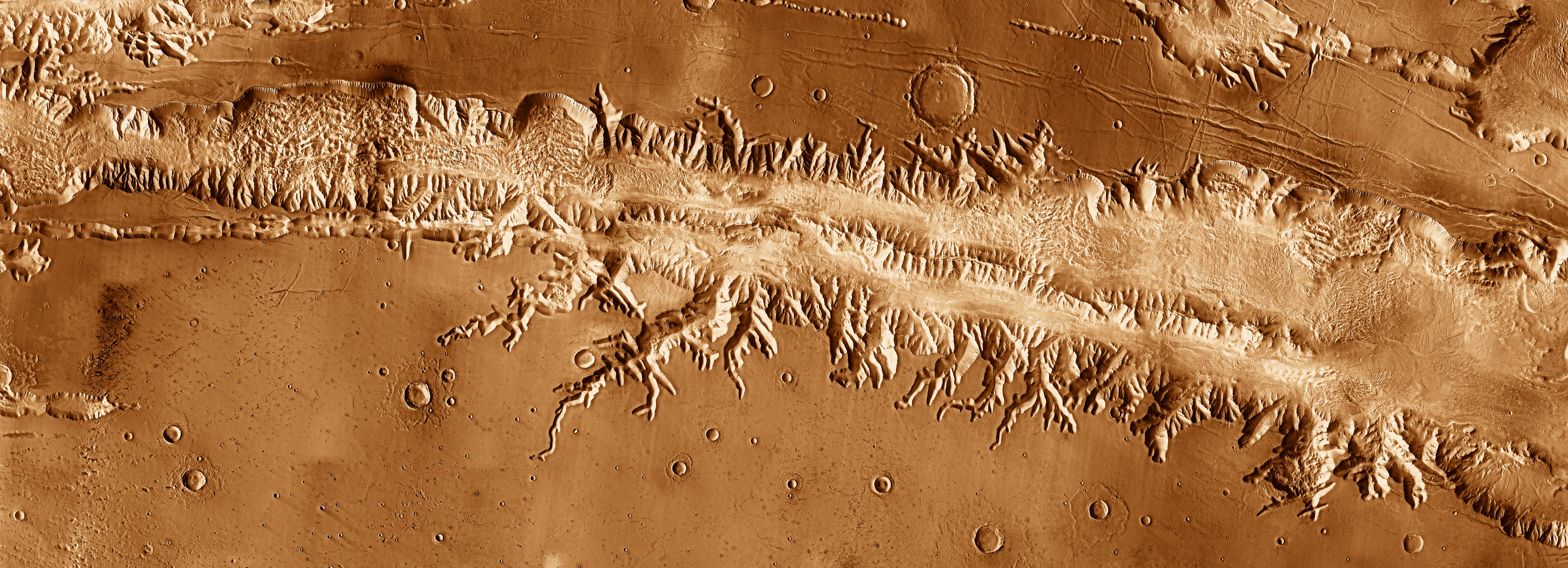
- Ius Chasma in mosaic of THEMIS infrared images, with parts of Tithonium, Candor and Melas chasmata visible at upper left and right, extreme upper right, and extreme lower right, respectively. Side canyons created by sapping are prominent in the central region. Near the right end are a series of massive landslide deposits, the Ius Labes. Calydon Fossa, a smaller parallel chasm, runs south of Ius Chasma at left.
- Coordinates: 7°S 85.8°W

Ius Chasma is a large canyon in the Coprates quadrangle of Mars at 7° south latitude and 85.8° west longitude. It is about 938 km long and was named after a classical albedo feature name.

== Valles Marineris Canyon System ==
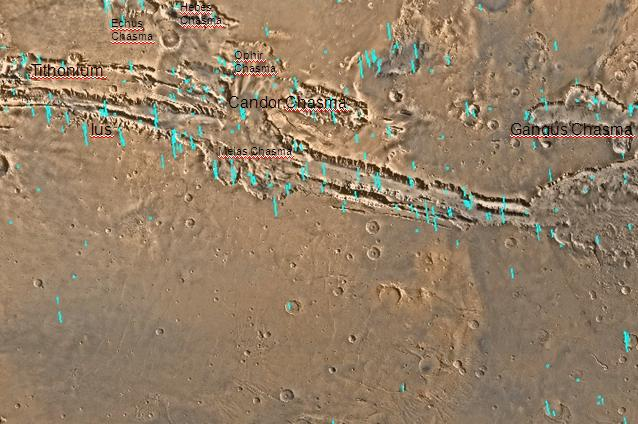
Map of Coprates quadrangle showing details of Valles Marineris, the largest canyon system in the Solar System. Some of the canyons may have once been filled with water.

Ius Chasma is a major part of Valles Marineris, the largest canyon system in the solar system; this great canyon would go almost all the way across the United States. Starting at the west with Noctis Labyrinthus in the Phoenicis Lacus quadrangle, the canyon system ends in the Margaritifer Sinus quadrangle with Capri Chasma and Eos Chasma (in the south). The word chasma has been designated by the International Astronomical Union to refer to an elongate, steep-sided depression. Valles Marineris was discovered by and named for the Mariner 9 mission. Moving east from Noctis Labyrinthus, the canyon splits into two troughs, Tithonium and Ius Chasma in the south. In the middle of the system are very wide valleys of Ophir Chasma (north), Candor Chasma, and Melas Chasma (south). Going farther to the east, one comes to Coprates Chasma. At the end of Coprates Chasma, the valley gets wider to form Capri Chasma in the north and Eos Chasma in the south. The walls of the canyons often contain many layers. The floors of some of the canyons contain large deposits of layered materials. Some researchers believe that the layers were formed when water once filled the canyons. The canyons are deep as well as long. In places they are 8-10 kilometers deep. (For comparison, the Earth's Grand Canyon is only 1.6 kilometers deep.)

== Layers ==
Images of rocks in the canyon walls almost always show layers. Some layers appear tougher than others. In the image below of Ganges Chasma layers, as seen by HiRISE, one can see that the upper, light-toned deposits are eroding much faster than the lower darker layers. Some cliffs on Mars show a few darker layers standing out and often breaking into large pieces; these are thought to be hard volcanic rock instead of soft ash deposits. Because of its closeness to the Tharsis volcanic region, the rock layers may be made of layer after layer of lava flows, probably mixed with deposits of volcanic ash that fell out of the air following big eruptions. It is likely the rock strata in the walls preserve a long geological history of Mars. Dark layers may be due to dark lava flows. The dark volcanic rock basalt is common on Mars. However, light-toned deposits may have resulted from rivers, lakes, volcanic ash, or wind blown deposits of sand or dust. The Mars Rovers found light-toned rocks to contain sulfates. Probably having been formed in water, sulfate deposits are of great interest to scientists because they may contain traces of ancient life.

== Sustained precipitation ==
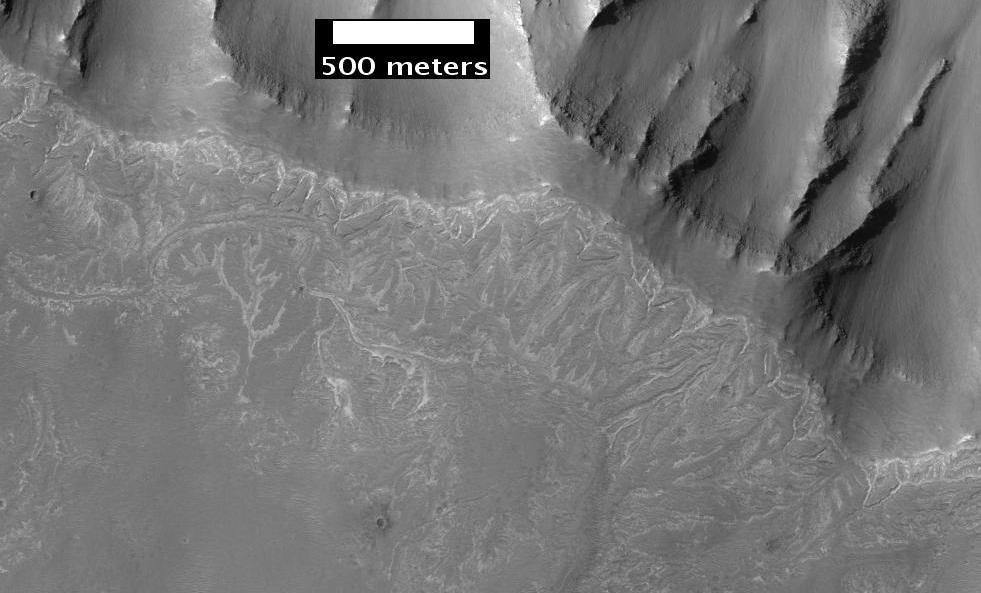
Channels near the rim of Ius Chasma, as seen by HiRISE. The pattern and high density of these channels support precipitation as the source of the water. Location is Coprates quadrangle.

Research, in the January 2010 issue of Icarus, described strong evidence for sustained precipitation in the area around Ius Chasma. The types of minerals there are associated with water. Also, the high density of small branching channels indicate a great deal of precipitation because they are similar to stream channels on the Earth.

Many places on Mars show channels of different sizes. There may be various origins for the water that produced channels. In some places, it seems that sapping was involved. Here around Ius Chasma, there is evidence for precipitation. If this is true, climate models may need to be modified because some models show that Mars may have been too cold for much liquid water. Many of these channels probably carried water, at least for a time. The climate of Mars has undergone cycles. It has been known for some time that Mars undergoes many large changes in its tilt or obliquity because its two small moons lack the gravity to stabilize it, as the Moon stabilizes Earth; at times the tilt of Mars has even been greater than 80 degrees

== See also ==
- Chasma
- Climate on Mars
- Geology of Mars
- Graben
- HiRISE
- Tectonics of Mars
- Valley networks (Mars)
