= Coprates Chasma =

Chasma on Mars

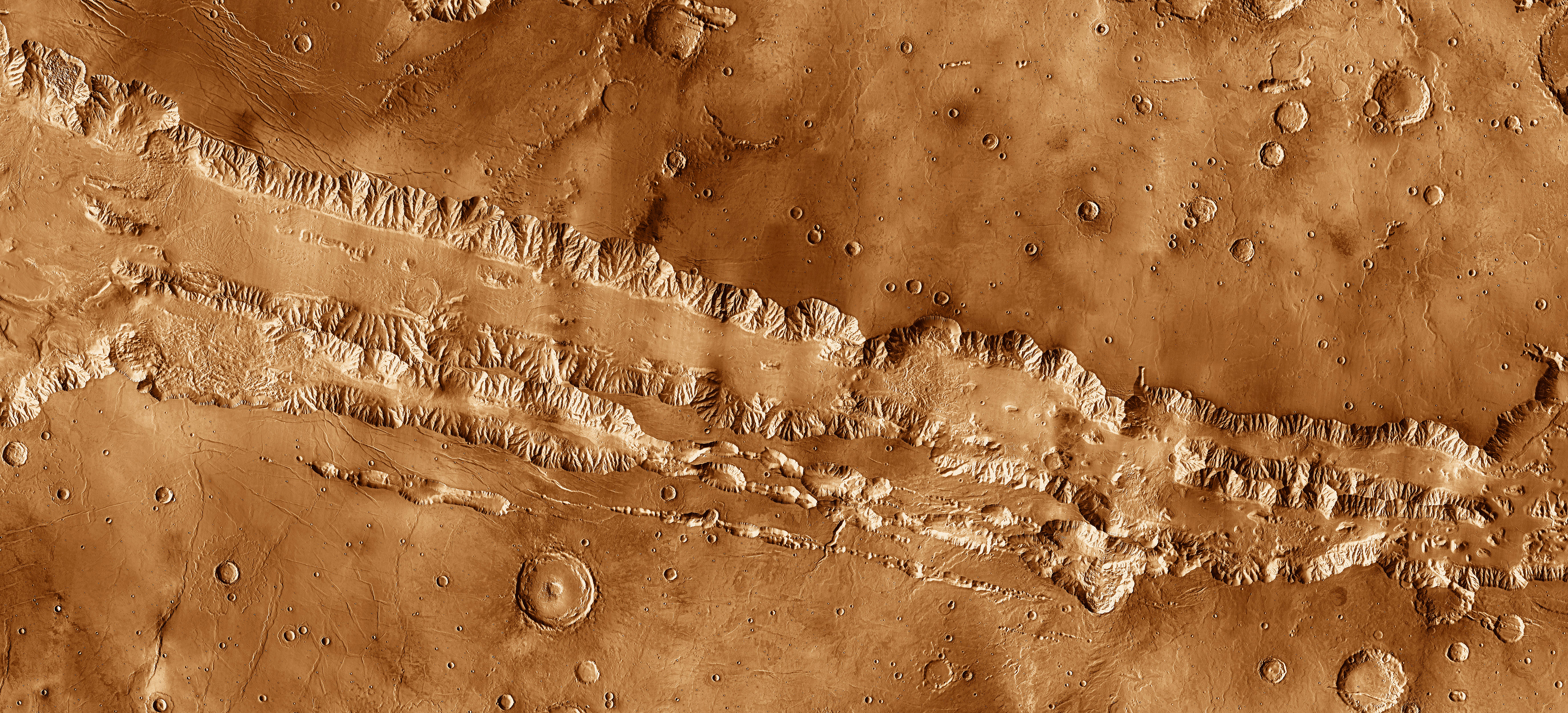
- Coprates Chasma in mosaic of THEMIS infrared images, with parts of Melas and Capri chasmata visible at upper left and lower right, respectively. Landslide deposits of enormous size are visible at left, near the junction with Melas Chasma, and at various locations from center to right. Several smaller chasmata and catenae parallel Coprates Chasma to its south.
- Coordinates: 13.4°S 61.4°W

Coprates Chasma based on THEMIS data

Coprates Chasma (/ˈkɒprətiːz ˈkæzmə/) is a huge canyon in the Coprates quadrangle of Mars, located at 13.4° south latitude and 61.4° west longitude, part of the Valles Marineris canyon system. It is 966 km (600 mi) long and was named after a classical albedo feature name. It was named from the classical Greek name for the Dez River in Persia.

Near 60° W is the deepest point of the Valles Marineris system (as well as its lowest point by elevation) at 11 km (36,000 ft) below the surrounding plateau. Eastward from here there is about a 0.03 degree upward slope before reaching the outflow channels, which means that if you filled the canyon with fluid, it would create a lake with a depth of 1 km (3,300 ft) before the fluid would overflow out onto the northern plains.

Keith Harrison and Mary Chapman described strong evidence for a former lake in the eastern part of Valles Marineris, especially in Coprates Chasma. It would have had an average depth of only 842 m—much smaller than the 5–10 km depth of parts of Valles Marineris. Still, its volume of 110,000 cubic miles would be comparable to Earth’s Caspian and Black Seas. The main evidence for such a lake is the presence of benches at the level that models show is where the lake level should be. Also, the low point in Eos Chasma where water would be expected to overflow is marked by fluvial features. The features look like the flow came together at a small point and carried out significant erosion.

The bottom of the Coprates Chasma contain a large field of small pitted cones which have been interpreted as Martian equivalents of terrestrial igneous or mud volcanoes.

== Recurrent slope lineae ==
Recurrent slope lineae are small dark streaks on slopes that elongate in warm seasons. They may be evidence of liquid water.

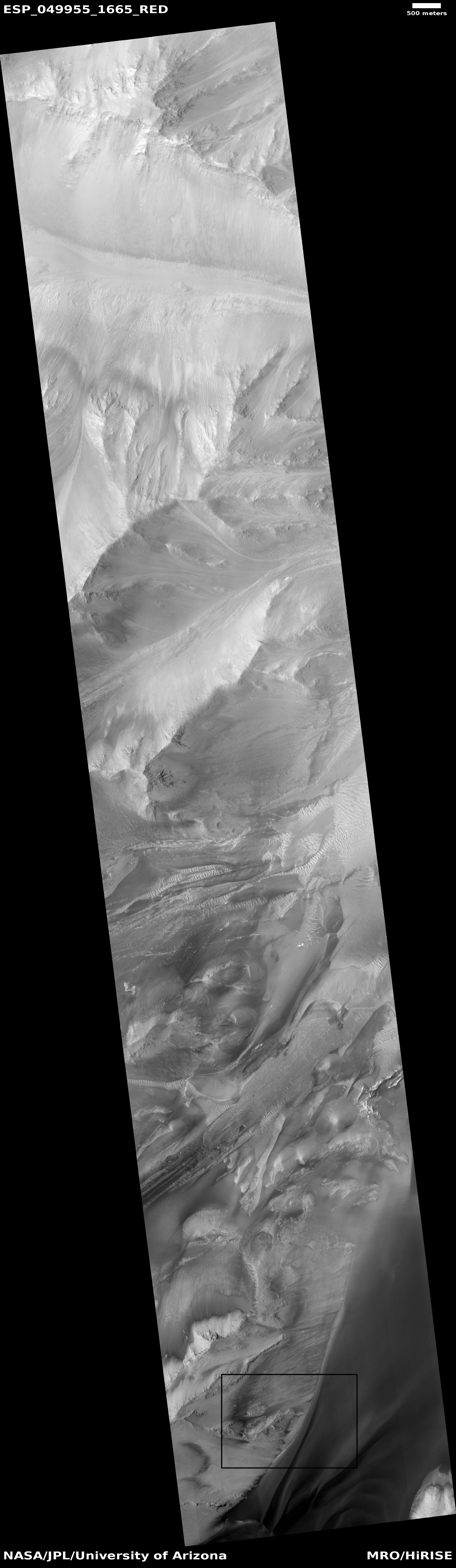
Wide view of part of Valles Marineris, as seen by HiRISE under HiWish program Box shows location of recurrent slope lineae that are enlarged in next image.

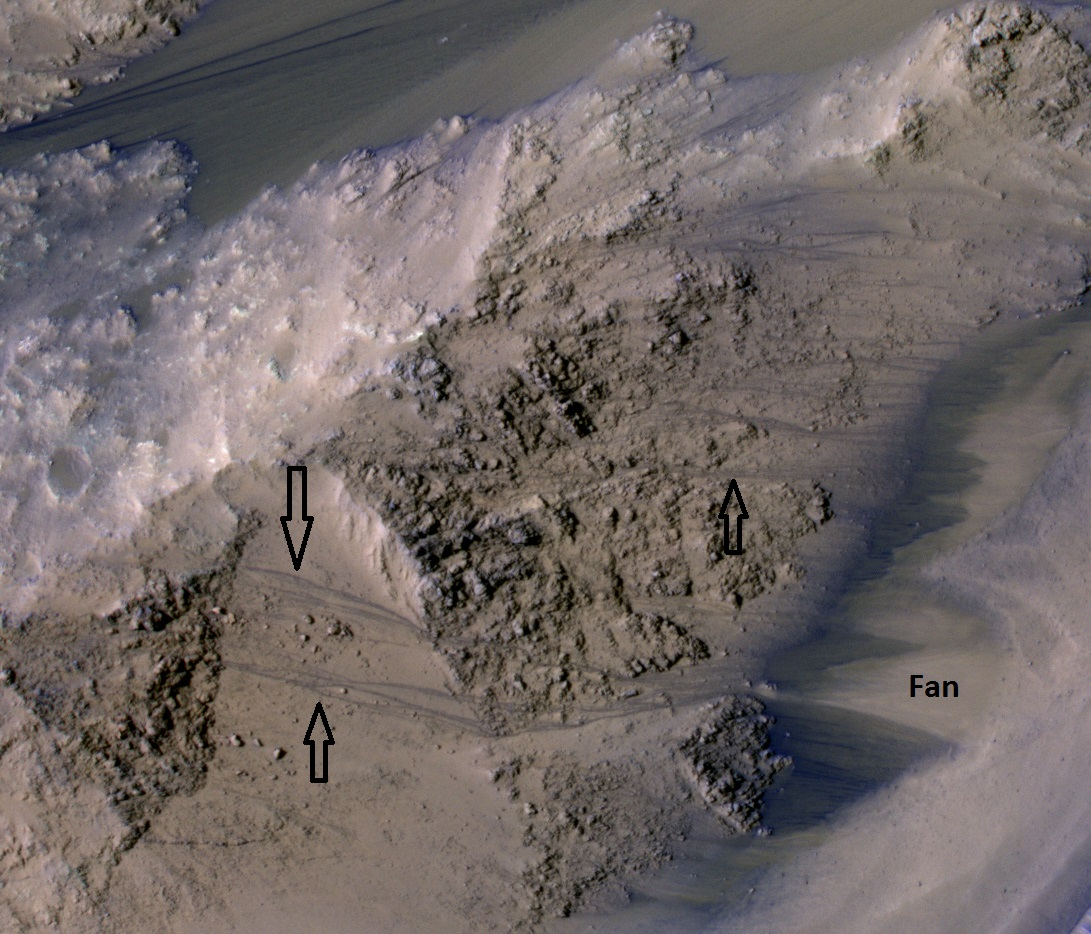
Close, color view of recurrent slope lineae, as seen by HiRISE under HiWish program Arrows point to some of the recurrent slope lineae.

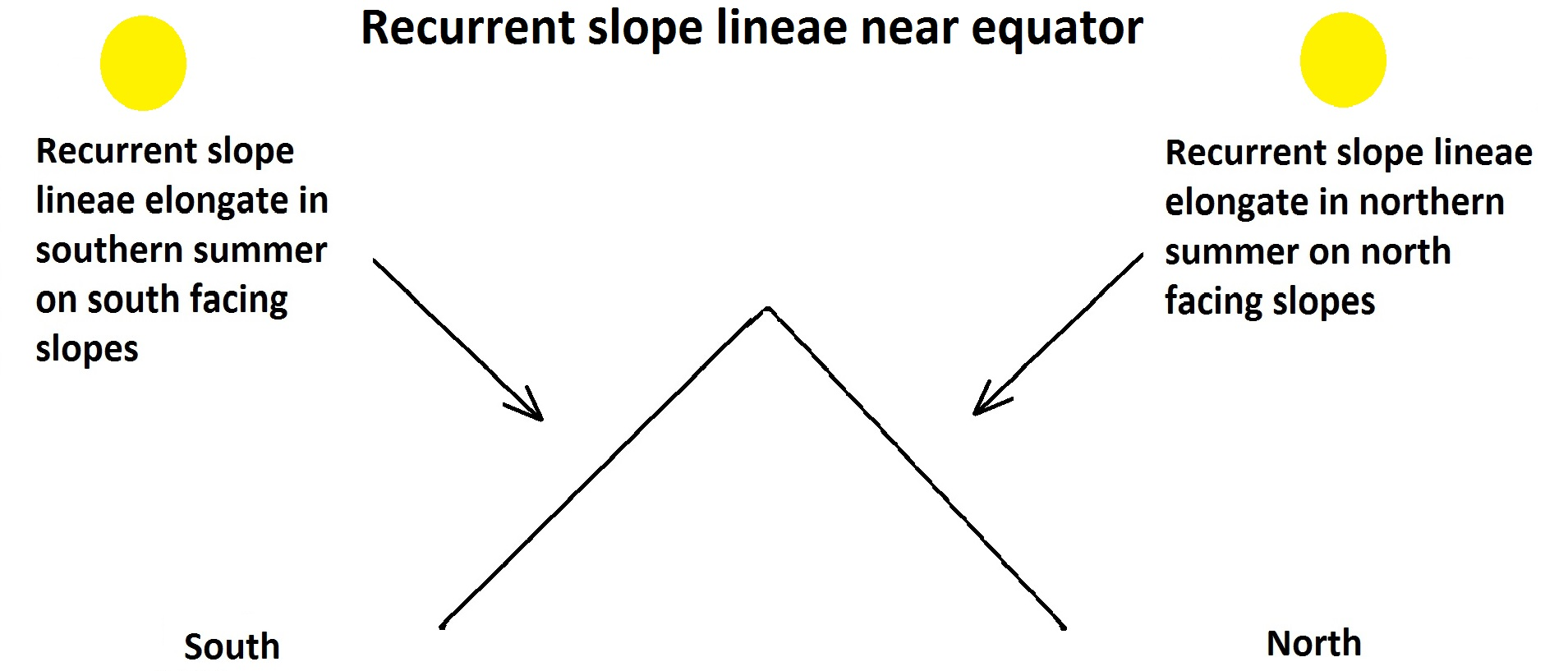
Recurrent slope lineae elongate when the slopes are at their warmest. Near the equator, RSL elongate on northern slopes in the northern summer and on the southern slopes in the southern summer.

== Gallery ==
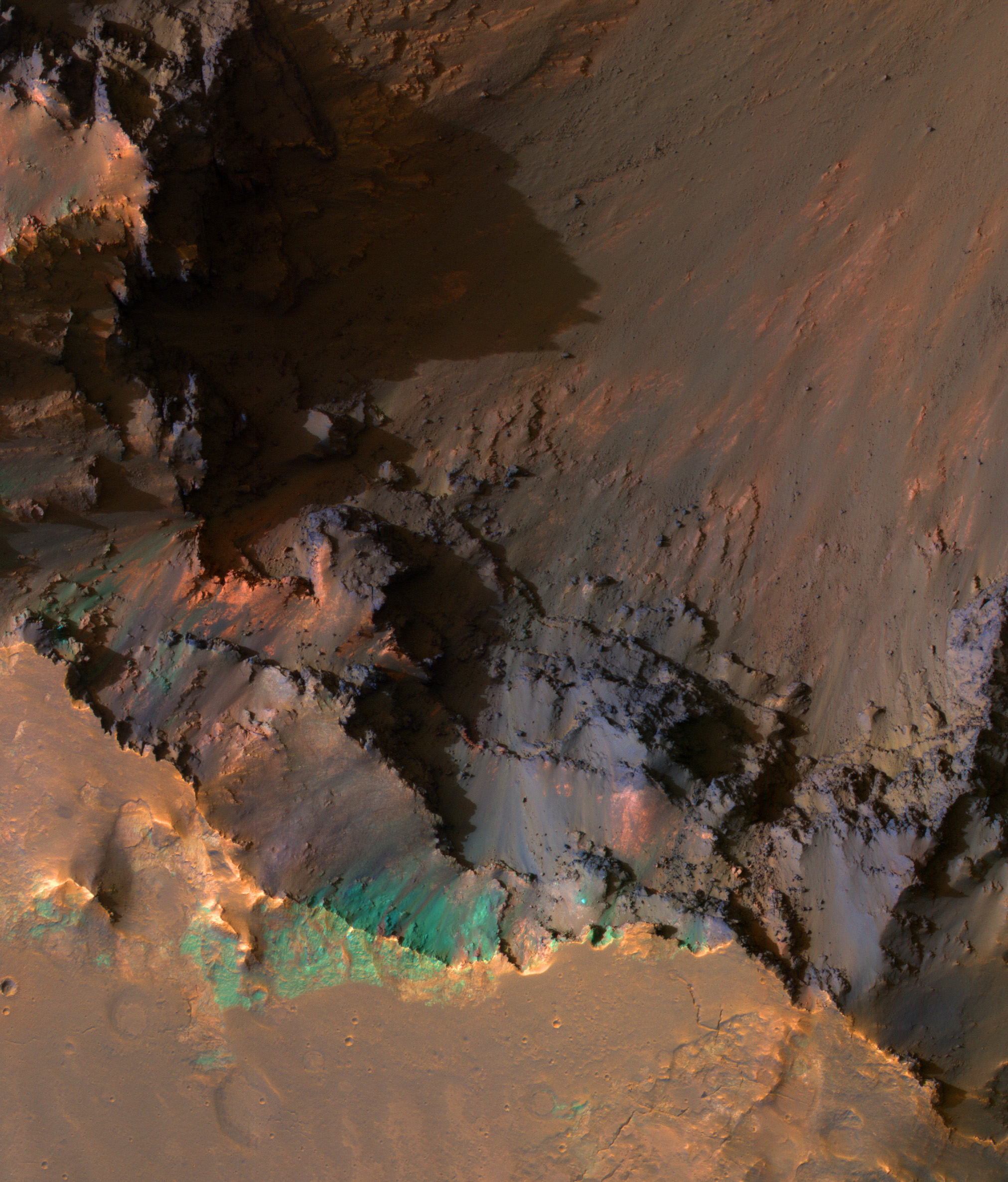
South rim of Coprates Chasma, image is about a kilometer wide. With enhanced IR colors, we see a portion of the very top of the south wall of the canyon, looking down onto the steep upper slopes of the canyon.

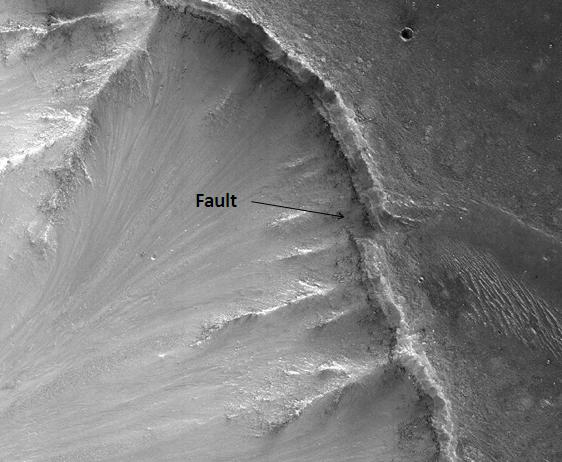
Faults, as seen by HiRISE. Layers in the rock face may be from volcanic, lacustrine, and/or aeolian sediments deposited in Valles Marineris.

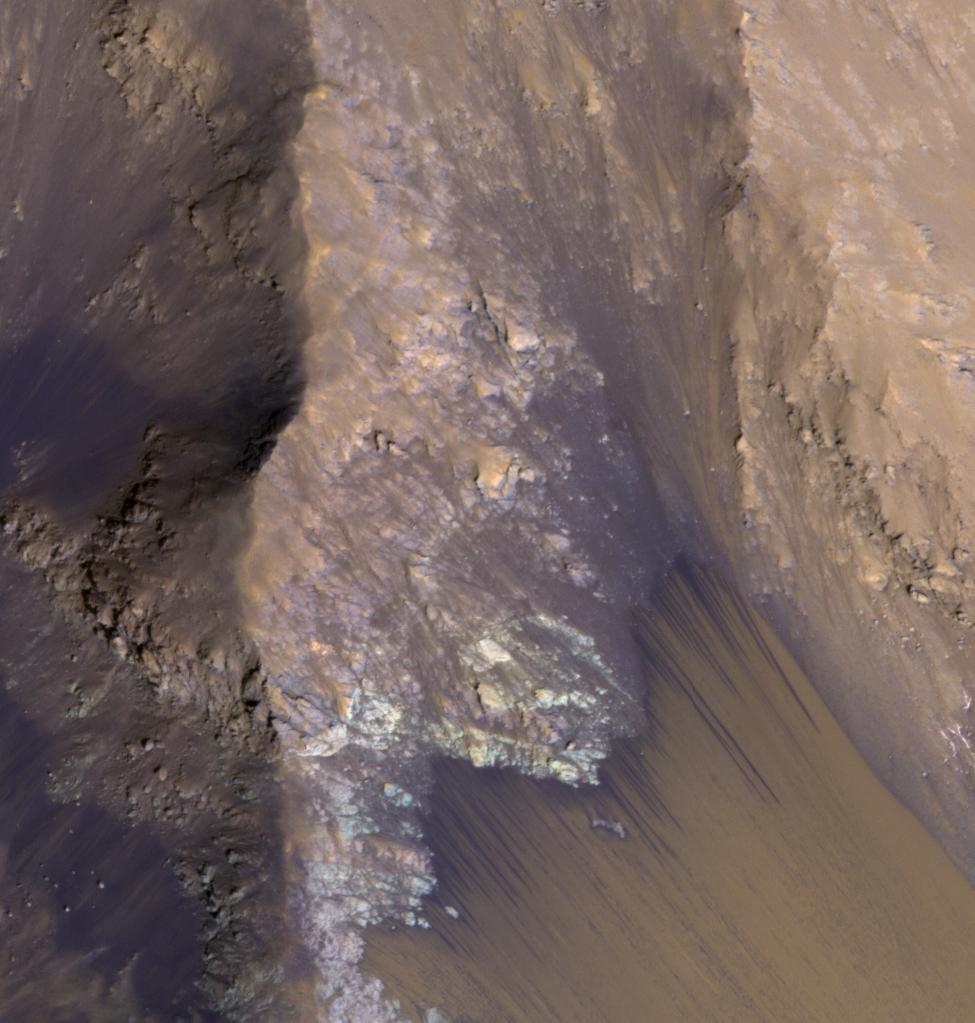
Seasonal flows on Coprates Chasma in Valles Marineris.

== See also ==
- Lakes on Mars
