= Coprates quadrangle =

Map of Mars

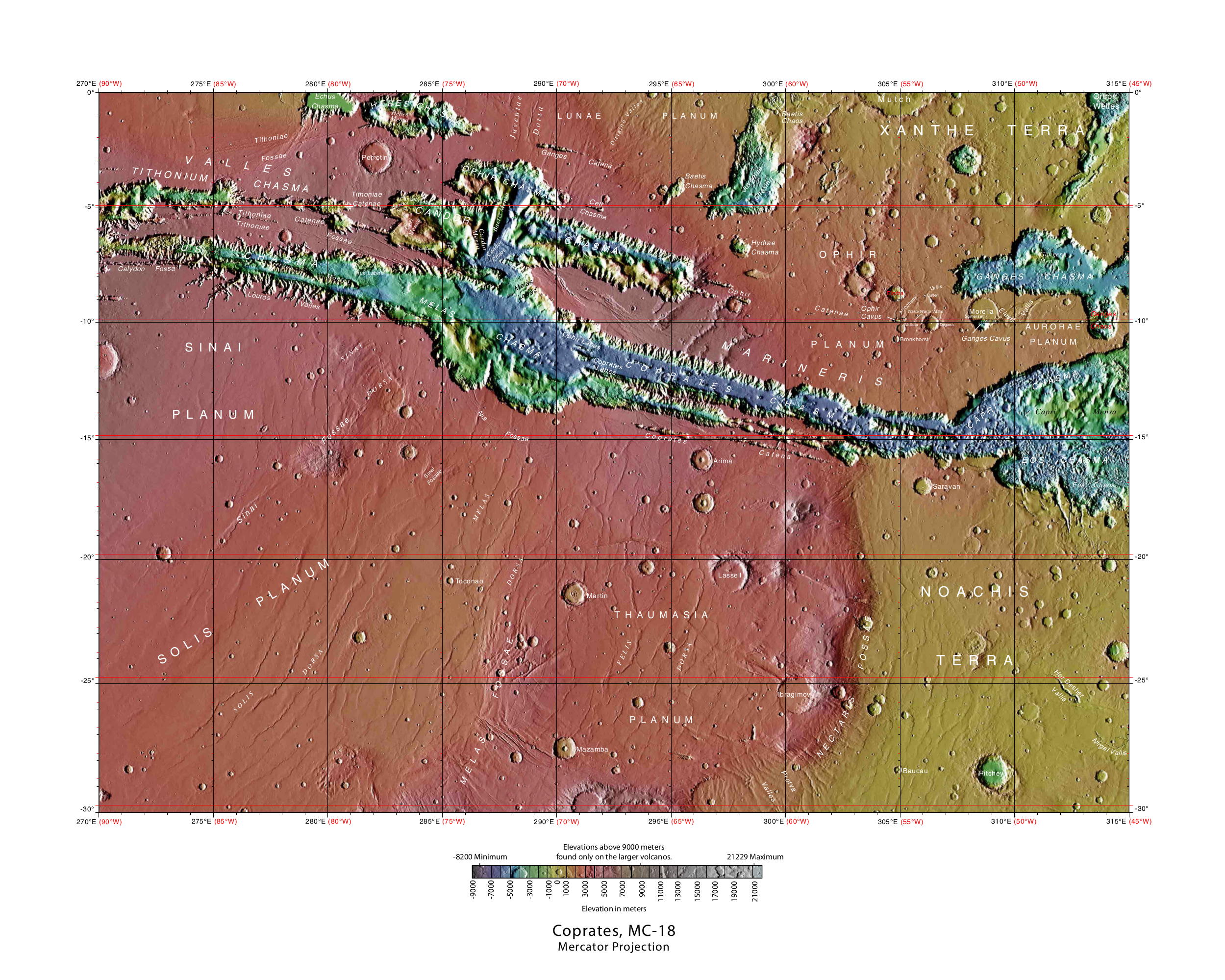
- Map of Coprates quadrangle from Mars Orbiter Laser Altimeter (MOLA) data. The highest elevations are red and the lowest are blue.
- Coordinates: 15°S 67.5°W

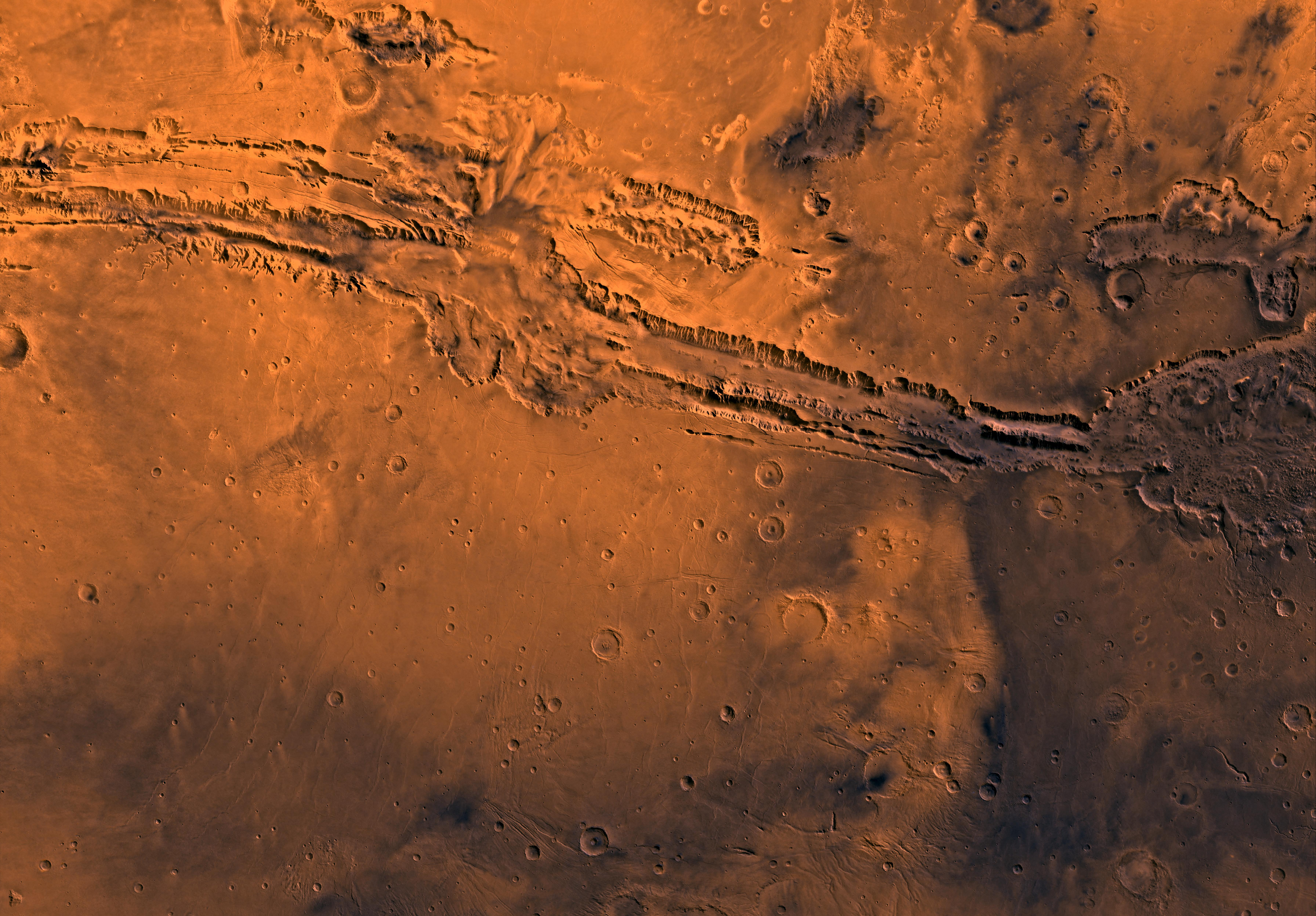
Image of the Coprates Quadrangle (MC-18). The prominent Valles Marineris chasma system intersects the moderately cratered northern part and the faulted highland ridged plains in the southern part.

The Coprates quadrangle is one of a series of 30 quadrangle maps of Mars used by the United States Geological Survey (USGS) Astrogeology Research Program. The Coprates quadrangle is also referred to as MC-18 (Mars Chart-18). The Coprates quadrangle contains parts of many of the old classical regions of Mars: Sinai Planum, Solis Planum, Thaumasia Planum, Lunae Planum, Noachis Terra, and Xanthe Terra.

The name Coprates refers to Coprates Chasma, a central trough of the Valles Marineris, named after the Greek name of the Dez River in Persia.

The Coprates quadrangle goes from 45° to 90° west longitude and 0° to 30° south latitude on Mars. Coprates quadrangle is famous for depicting the "Grand Canyon of Mars", the Valles Marineris Canyon System. Signs of water exist in this quadrangle, with ancient river valleys and networks of stream channels showing up as inverted terrain and lakes inside of Valles Marineris.

== Naming ==
Coprates is the name of a telescopic albedo feature located at 15° S and 60° W on Mars. It is named after the Coprates River, an ancient name for the Dez, a tributary of the Karun in modern Iran which empties into the Shatt al-Arab near its Persian Gulf estuary. The name was approved by the International Astronomical Union (IAU) in 1958.

== Valles Marineris canyon system ==
Valles Marineris is the largest canyon system in the Solar System; this great canyon would go almost all the way across the United States. The name for the whole system of canyons is Valles Marineris. Starting at the west with Noctis Labyrinthus in the Phoenicis Lacus quadrangle, the canyon system ends in the Margaritifer Sinus quadrangle with Capri Chasma and Eos Chasma (in the south). The word Chasma has been designated by the International Astronomical Union to refer to an elongate, steep-sided depression. Valles Marineris was discovered by and named for the Mariner 9 mission. Moving east from Noctis Labyrinthus, the canyon splits into two troughs, Tithonium Chasma and Ius Chasma (in the south). In the middle of the system are the very wide valleys of Ophir Chasma (north), Candor Chasma, and Melas Chasma (south). Going farther to the east, one comes to Coprates Chasma. At the end of Coprates Chasma, the valley gets wider to form Capri Chasma in the north and Eos Chasma in the south. The walls of the canyons often contain many layers. The floors of some of the canyons contain large deposits of layered materials. Some researchers believe that the layers were formed when water once filled the canyons. The canyons are deep as well as long; in places they are 8–10 kilometers deep, much deeper than the Earth's Grand Canyon, which is only 1.6 kilometers deep.

In a study published in the journal Geology in August 2009, a group of scientists led by John Adams of the University of Washington in Seattle proposed that Valles Marineris may have formed from a giant collapse when salts were heated up, thereby releasing water which rushed out carrying mud through underground plumbing. One point that supports this idea is that sulfate salts have been found in the area. These salts contain water which comes off when heated. Heat may have been generated by volcanic processes. After all, a number of huge volcanoes are nearby. Other ideas have been advanced by others to explain the origin of the system.

== Interior layered deposits and sulfate ==
Parts of the floors of Candor Chasma and Juventae Chasma contain layered deposits that have been termed interior layered deposits (ILD's) and equatorial layered deposits (ELDs). These layers may have formed when the whole area was a giant lake. However, many other ideas have been advanced to explain them. High-resolution structural and geologic mapping in west Candor Chasma, presented in March 2015, showed that the deposits on the floor of the Candor chasma are basin filling sediments that were deposited in a wet playa like setting; hence water was involved in their formation.

Some places on Mars contain hydrated sulfate deposits, including ILD's. Sulfate formation involves the presence of water. The European Space Agency's Mars Express found possible evidence of the sulfates epsomite and kieserite. Scientists want to visit these areas with robotic rovers.

These deposits have been found to contain ferric oxides in the form of crystalline grey hematite.

== Layers ==
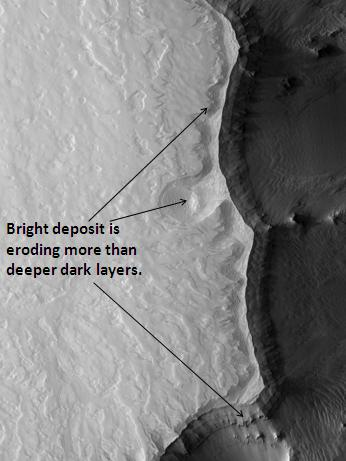
Ganges Chasma Layers, as seen by HiRISE

Images of rocks in the canyon walls almost always show layers. Some layers appear tougher than others. In the image below of Ganges Chasma Layers, as seen by HiRISE, one can see that the upper, light-toned deposits are eroding much faster than the lower darker layers. Some cliffs on Mars show a few darker layers standing out and often breaking into large pieces; these are thought to be hard volcanic rock instead of soft ash deposits. An example of hard layers is shown below in the picture of layers in the canyon wall in Coprates, as seen by Mars Global Surveyor. Because of its closeness to the Tharsis volcanic region, the rock layers may be made of layer after layer of lava flows, probably mixed with deposits of volcanic ash that fell out of the air following big eruptions. It is likely the rock strata in the walls preserve a long geological history of Mars. Dark layers may be due to dark lava flows. The dark volcanic rock basalt is common on Mars. However, light-toned deposits may have resulted from rivers, lakes, volcanic ash, or wind blown deposits of sand or dust. The Mars Rovers found light-toned rocks to contain sulfates. Probably having been formed in water, sulfate deposits are of great interest to scientists because they may contain traces of ancient life. The Mars Reconnaissance Orbiter Compact Reconnaissance Imaging Spectrometer for Mars (CRISM) instrument found opaline silica in certain strata along and within the Valles Marineris canyon system. Because Iron sulfates were sometimes found near the opaline silica, it is thought that the two deposits were formed with an acid fluid.

== Hebes Chasma and hydrated deposits ==
Hebes Chasma, a large enclosed valley, may have once held water. Hydrated minerals have been found there. It is thought that large-scale underground springs of groundwater at different times burst to the surface to form deposits called Light Toned Deposits (LTDs). Some suggest present or fossilized life forms may be found there because the deposits are relatively young.

== Nirgal Vallis and sapping ==
Nirgal Vallis is one of the longest valley networks on Mars. It is so large that it is found on more than one quadrangle. Scientists do not know how all the ancient river valleys were formed. There is evidence that instead of rain or snow, the water that formed the valleys originated underground. One mechanism that has been advanced is sapping. In sapping, the ground just gives away as water comes out. Sapping is common in some desert areas in America's Southwest. Sapping forms alcoves and stubby tributaries. These features are visible in the picture below of Nigal Vallis taken with Mars Odyssey's THEMIS.

Water from Nirgal Vallis contributed to a great flood that went through the rim of Holden Crater and helped form a lake in the crater. It is estimated that Nirgal Vallis had a discharge of 4800 cubic meters/second. Water from Nirgal Vallis was inbounded in Uzboi Vallis because the rim of Holden Crater blocked the flow. At a certain point the stored water broke through the rim of Holden and created a lake 200–250 m deep. Water with a depth of at least 50 m entered Holden at a rate that 5–10 times the discharge of the Mississippi River. Terraces and the presence of large rocks (tens of meters across) support these high discharge rates.

== Inverted relief ==
Some areas of Mars show inverted relief, where features that were once depressions, like streams, are now instead above the surface. These may have been formed when materials, like large rocks, were deposited in low-lying areas, then left behind after erosion (perhaps wind which can not move large rocks) removed much of the surface layers. Other ways of making inverted relief might be lava flowing down a stream bed or materials being cemented by minerals dissolved in water. On Earth, materials cemented by silica are highly resistant to all kinds of erosional forces. Inverted relief in the shape of streams are further evidence of water flowing on the Martian surface in past times. There are many examples of inverted channels near Juventae Chasma; some are shown in the image of Juventae Chasma below.

== Vallis ==
Vallis (plural valles) is the Latin word for valley. It is used in planetary geology for the naming of landform features on other planets.

Vallis was used for old river valleys that were discovered on Mars, when probes were first sent to Mars. The Viking Orbiters caused a revolution in our ideas about water on Mars; huge river valleys were found in many areas. Space craft cameras showed that floods of water broke through dams, carved deep valleys, eroded grooves into bedrock, and traveled thousands of kilometers.

== Recurrent slope lineae ==
Recurrent slope lineae (RSL) are small dark streaks on slopes that elongate in warm seasons. They may be evidence of liquid water.

== Water ice ==
Deposits of water ice have been found in Candor Chaos in the middle area of Valles Marineris. The neutron telescope on EXoMars found that up to 40.3 wt% of the top meter of soil is probably water ice. The instrument involved is called the Fine-Resolution Epithermal Neutron Detector (FREND). Candor Chaos is about the size of the a Netherlands.

== See also ==
- Chasma
- Classical albedo features on Mars
- Juventae Chasma
- Geology of Mars
- Groundwater on Mars
- HiRISE
- Lakes on Mars
- List of quadrangles on Mars
- Martian Gullies
- MOC Public Targeting Program
- Planetary nomenclature#Mars
- Vallis
- Water on Mars

MC-01 Mare Boreum (features)
MC-02 Diacria (features)		MC-03 Arcadia (features)	MC-04 Acidalium (features)	MC-05 Ismenius Lacus (features)		MC-06 Casius (features)	MC-07 Cebrenia (features)
MC-08 Amazonis (features)	MC-09 Tharsis (features)	MC-10 Lunae Palus (features)	MC-11 Oxia Palus (features)	MC-12 Arabia (features)	MC-13 Syrtis Major (features)	MC-14 Amenthes (features)	MC-15 Elysium (features)
MC-16 Memnonia (features)	MC-17 Phoenicis Lacus (features)	MC-18 Coprates (features)	MC-19 Margaritifer Sinus (features)	MC-20 Sinus Sabaeus (features)	MC-21 Iapygia (features)	MC-22 Mare Tyrrhenum (features)	MC-23 Aeolis (features)
MC-24 Phaethontis (features)		MC-25 Thaumasia (features)	MC-26 Argyre (features)	MC-27 Noachis (features)		MC-28 Hellas (features)	MC-29 Eridania (features)
MC-30 Mare Australe (features)
