= Calydon fossa =

Valley in Valles Marineris on Mars

The Calydon fossa is the valley in Valles Marineris on Mars. It is situated at 7°S 88°W.

== Shape and size ==
The fossa runs parallel to the equator and has width varying from 5 to 8 km in most places.
