= Ganges Chasma =

Chasma on Mars

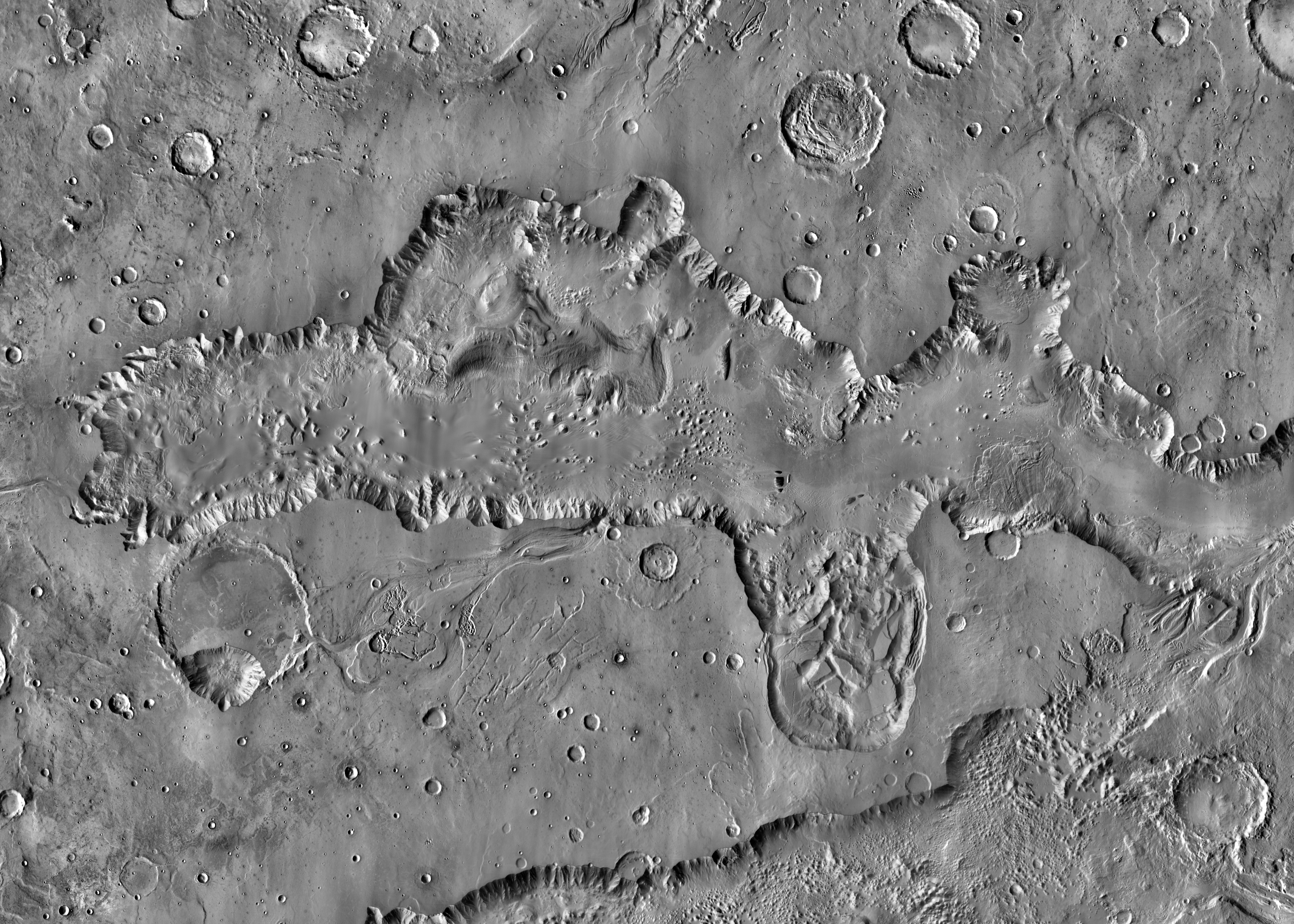
- Ganges Chasma, as seen by THEMIS.
- Coordinates: 8.0°S 48.1°W
- Length: 584.0 km

Ganges Chasma is a deep canyon at the eastern end of the vast Valles Marineris system on Mars, an offshoot of Capri Chasma, and is in the Coprates quadrangle. It is named after the River Ganges in South Asia. Ganges Chasma is thought to have formed through a series of catastrophic discharges of water and CO_{2} from chaos terrains such as that preserved in Ganges Chaos at its southern margin. Most of the evidence for these discharges and the ensuing collapses is believed to have been washed away. Prior to developing an outlet that joined it to Capri Chasma and the connected outflow channels to its east, Ganges Chasma may at some point in the Noachian period have contained a lake which drained northward through partially subsurface pathways into Shalbatana Vallis.

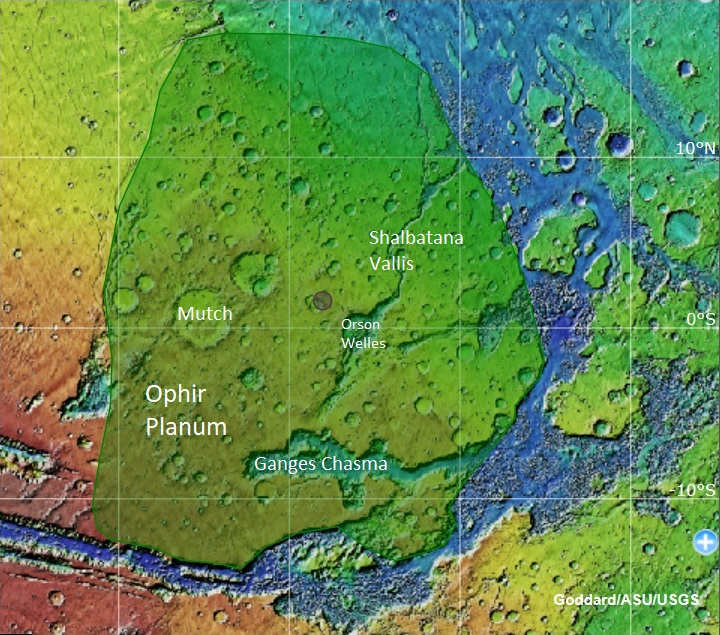
Map of Xanthe Terra that shows location of Ganges Chasma and other major features

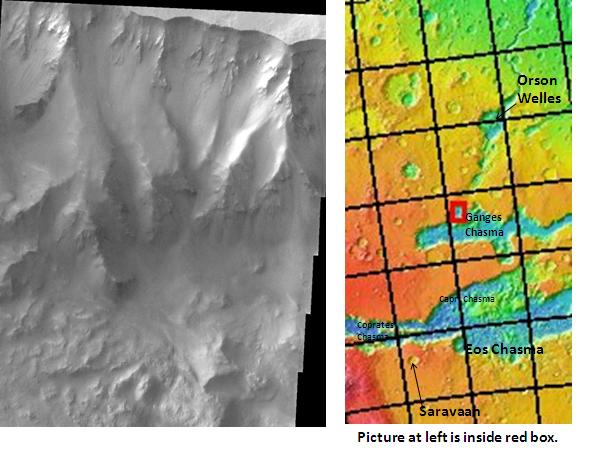
Cliff in northern wall of Ganges Chasma, as seen by THEMIS. Click on image to see relationship with other features in the Coprates region.

== See also ==
- Chasma
- Climate on Mars
- Geology of Mars
- Outflow channels
