= Chasma =

Deep, elongated, steep-sided depression on a planetary surface

In planetary nomenclature, a chasma /ˈkæzmə/ (plural: chasmata /ˈkæzmətə/) is a deep, elongated, steep-sided depression. As of 2020, the IAU has named 122 such features in the Solar System, on Venus (63), Mars (25), Saturn's satellites Mimas (6), Tethys (2), Dione (8) and Rhea (5), Uranus's satellites Ariel (7), Titania (2) and Oberon (1) and Pluto's satellite Charon (3). An example is Eos Chasma on Mars.

== Mars ==
Below are images of some of the major chasmata of Mars. The map shows their relative locations.

=== Interior layered deposits and sulfate ===
Parts of the floor of Candor Chasma contains layered deposits that have been termed interior layered deposits (ILDs). These layers may have formed when the whole area was a giant lake. Some places on Mars contain hydrated sulfate deposits. Sulfate formation involves the presence of water. The European Space Agency's Mars Express found evidence of perhaps epsomite and kieserite. Scientists want to visit these areas with robotic rovers.

=== Layers ===
Images of rocks in the canyon walls almost always show layers. Some layers appear tougher than others. In the image below of Ganges Chasma layers, as seen by HiRISE, one can see that the upper, light-toned deposits are eroding much faster than the lower darker layers. Some cliffs on Mars show a few darker layers standing out and often breaking into large pieces; these are thought to be hard volcanic rock instead of soft ash deposits. An example of hard layers is shown below in the picture of layers in the canyon wall in Coprates, as seen by Mars Global Surveyor. Because of its closeness to the Tharsis volcanic region, the rock layers may be made of layer after layer of lava flows, probably mixed with deposits of volcanic ash that fell out of the air following big eruptions. It is likely the rock strata in the walls preserve a long geological history of Mars. Dark layers may be due to dark lava flows. The dark volcanic rock basalt is common on Mars. However, light-toned deposits may have resulted from rivers, lakes, volcanic ash, or wind-blown deposits of sand or dust. The Mars Rovers found light-toned rocks containing sulfates. Probably having been formed in water, sulfate deposits are of great interest to scientists because they may contain traces of ancient life.

=== Hebes Chasma and hydrated deposits ===
Hebes Chasma, a large enclosed valley, may have once held water. Hydrated minerals have been found there. It is thought that large-scale underground springs of groundwater at different times burst to the surface to form deposits called Light-Toned Deposits (LTDs). Some suggest present or fossilized life forms may be found there because the deposits are relatively young.

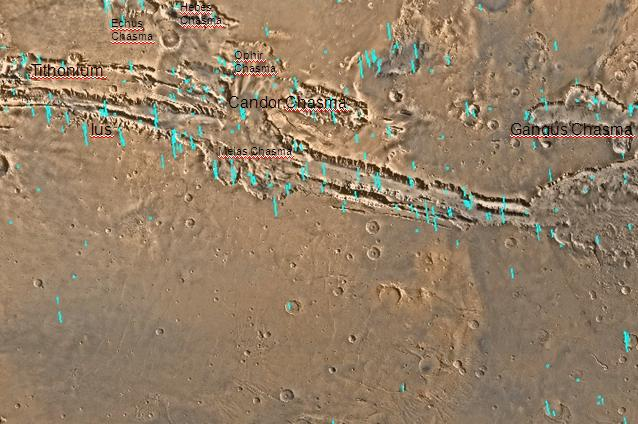
Map of Coprates quadrangle showing details of Valles Marineris, the largest canyon system in the solar system. Some of the canyons may have once been filled with water. The map shows the locations of a number of major chasma.

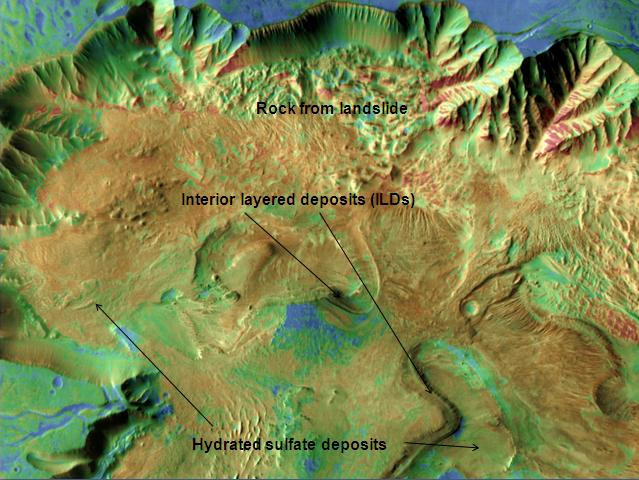
False-color image of Candor Chasma showing locations of hydrated sulfate deposits, as seen by Mars Odyssey THEMIS. Red colors show rocky places. Greens and blues show sandy, dusty areas.

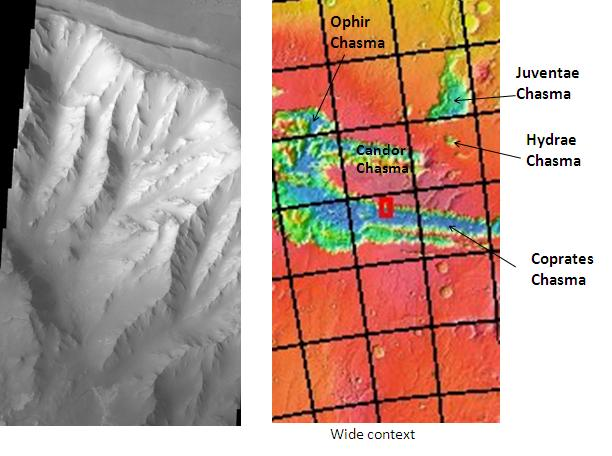
Melas Chasma, as seen by THEMIS. Click on image to see relationship of Melas to other features.

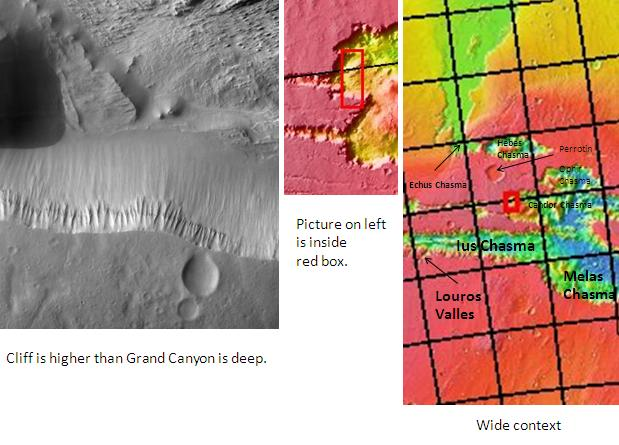
Cliff in Candor Chasma plateau, as seen by THEMIS. Click on image to see relationship with other features in Coprates quadrangle.

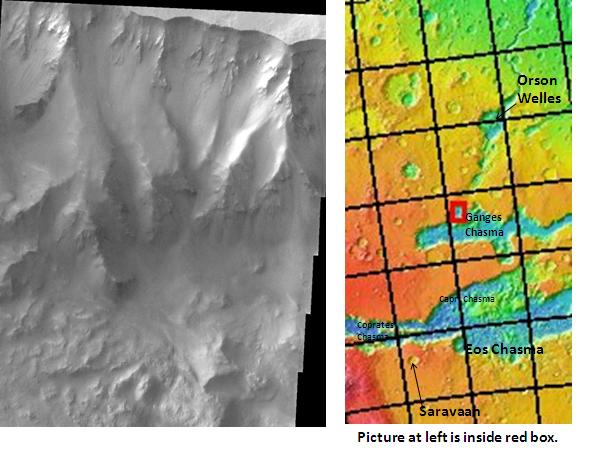
Cliff in northern wall of Ganges Chasma, as seen by THEMIS. Click on image to see relationship with other features in the Coprates quadrangle.

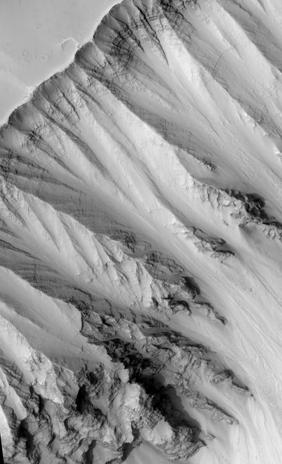
Ophir Chasma wall, as seen by HiRISE.

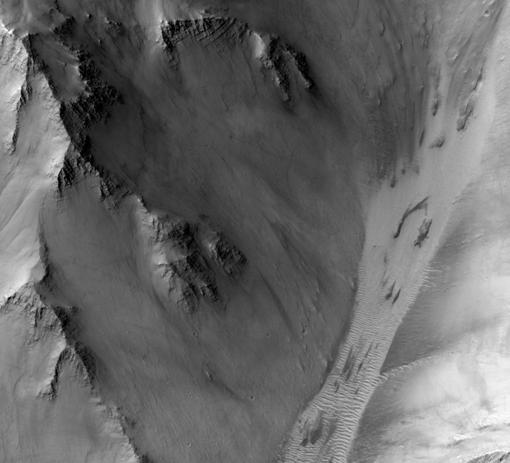
Ius Chasma, as seen by HiRISE. Click on image to see layers.

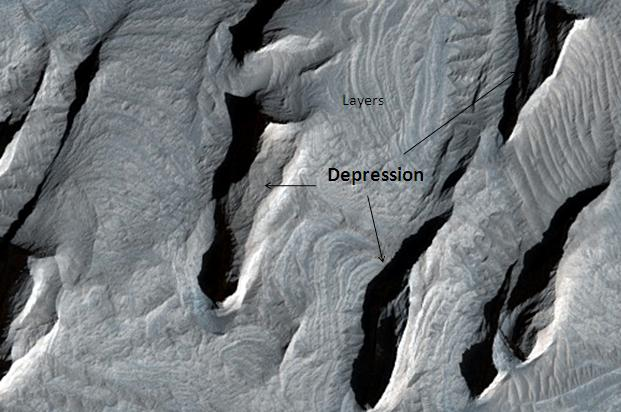
Tithonium Chasma layers, as seen by HiRISE.

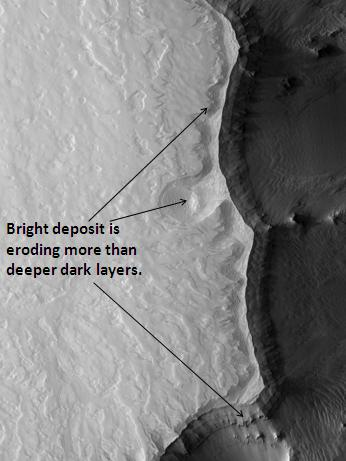
Ganges Chasma layers, as seen by HiRISE.

== See also ==
- Geology of Mars – Geology of fourth planet from the Sun
