= Tectonics of Mars =

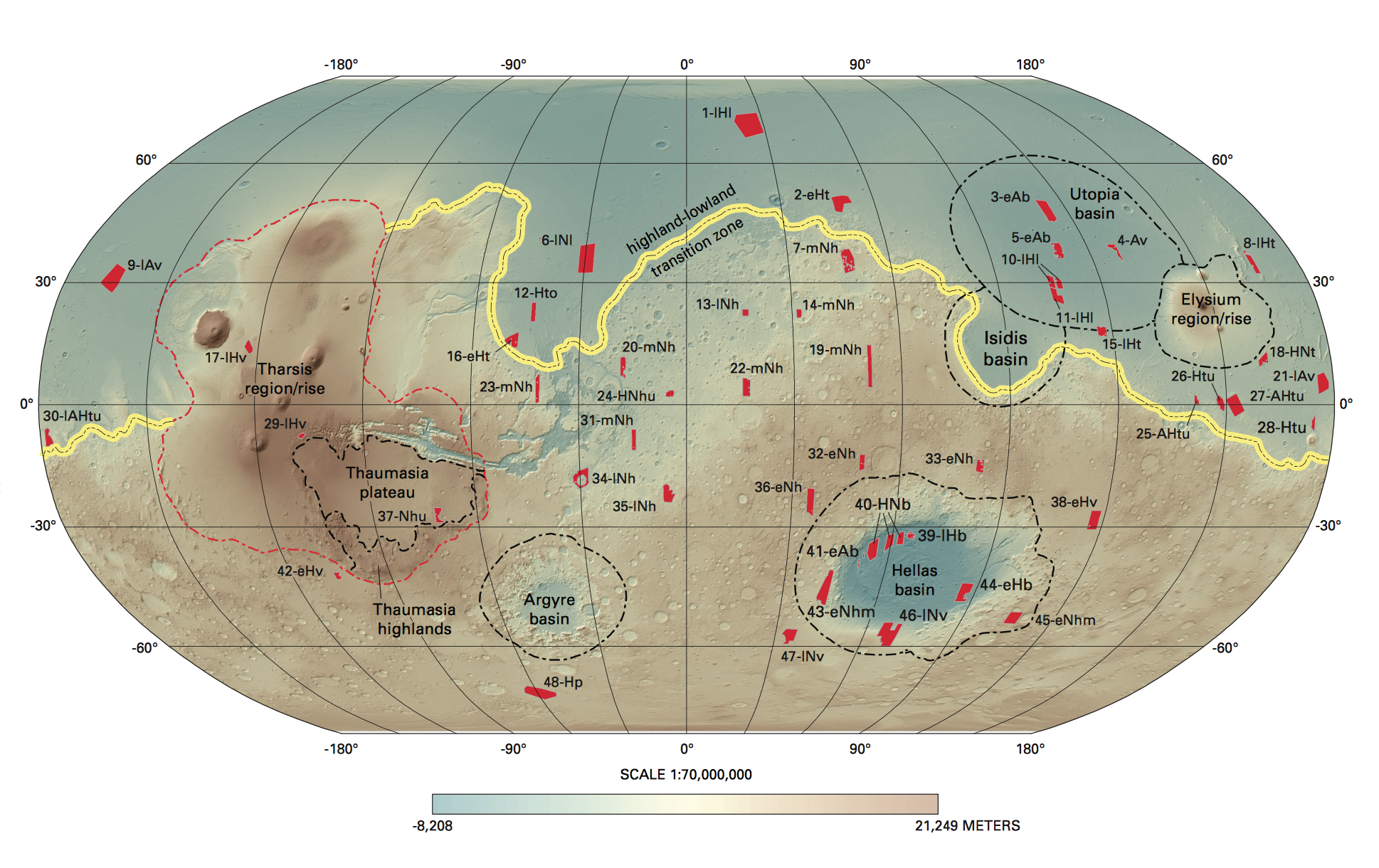
Topographic map of Mars showing the highland-lowland boundary marked in yellow, and the Tharsis rise outlined in red (USGS, 2014).

Like the Earth, the crustal properties and structure of the surface of Mars are thought to have evolved through time; in other words, as on Earth, tectonic processes have shaped the planet. However, both the ways this change has happened and the properties of the planet's lithosphere are very different when compared to the Earth. Today, Mars is believed to be largely tectonically inactive. However, observational evidence and its interpretation suggests that this was not the case further back in Mars's geological history.

At the scale of the whole planet, two large scale physiographic features are apparent on the surface. The first is that the northern hemisphere of the planet is much lower than the southern, and has been more recently resurfaced – also implying that the crustal thickness beneath the surface is distinctly bimodal. This feature is referred to as the "hemispheric dichotomy". The second is the Tharsis rise, a massive volcanic province that has had major tectonic influences both on a regional and global scale in Mars's past. On this basis, the surface of Mars is often divided into three major physiographic provinces, each with different geological and tectonic characteristics: the northern plains, the southern highlands, and the Tharsis plateau. Much tectonic study of Mars seeks to explain the processes that led to the planet's division into these three provinces, and how their differing characteristics arose. Hypotheses proposed to explain how the two primary tectonic events may have occurred are usually divided into endogenic (arising from the planet itself) and exogenic (foreign to the planet, e.g., meteorite impact) processes. This distinction occurs throughout the study of tectonics on Mars.

In general, Mars lacks unambiguous evidence that terrestrial-style plate tectonics has shaped its surface. However, in some places magnetic anomalies in the Martian crust that are linear in shape and of alternating polarity have been detected by orbiting satellites. Some authors have argued that these share an origin with similar stripes found on Earth's seafloor, which have been attributed to gradual production of new crust at spreading mid-ocean ridges. Other authors have argued that large-scale strike-slip fault zones can be identified on the surface of Mars (e.g., in the Valles Marineris trough), which can be likened to plate-bounding transform faults on Earth such as the San Andreas and Dead Sea faults. These observations provide some indication that at least some parts of Mars may have undergone plate tectonics deep in its geological past.

== Physiographic provinces ==
=== Southern highlands ===
The southern highlands are heavily cratered and separated from the northern plains by the global dichotomy boundary. Strong magnetic stripes with alternating polarity run roughly east to west in the southern hemisphere, concentric with the south pole. These magnetic anomalies are found in rocks dating from the first 500 million years in Mars's history, indicating that an intrinsic magnetic field would have ceased to exist before the early Noachian. The magnetic anomalies on Mars measure 200 km width, roughly ten times wider than those found on Earth.

=== Northern plains ===
The northern plains are several kilometers lower in elevation than the southern highlands, and have a much lower crater density, indicating a younger surface age. The underlying crust is however thought to be the same age as that of the southern highlands. Unlike the southern highlands, magnetic anomalies in the northern plains are sparse and weak.

=== Tharsis plateau ===
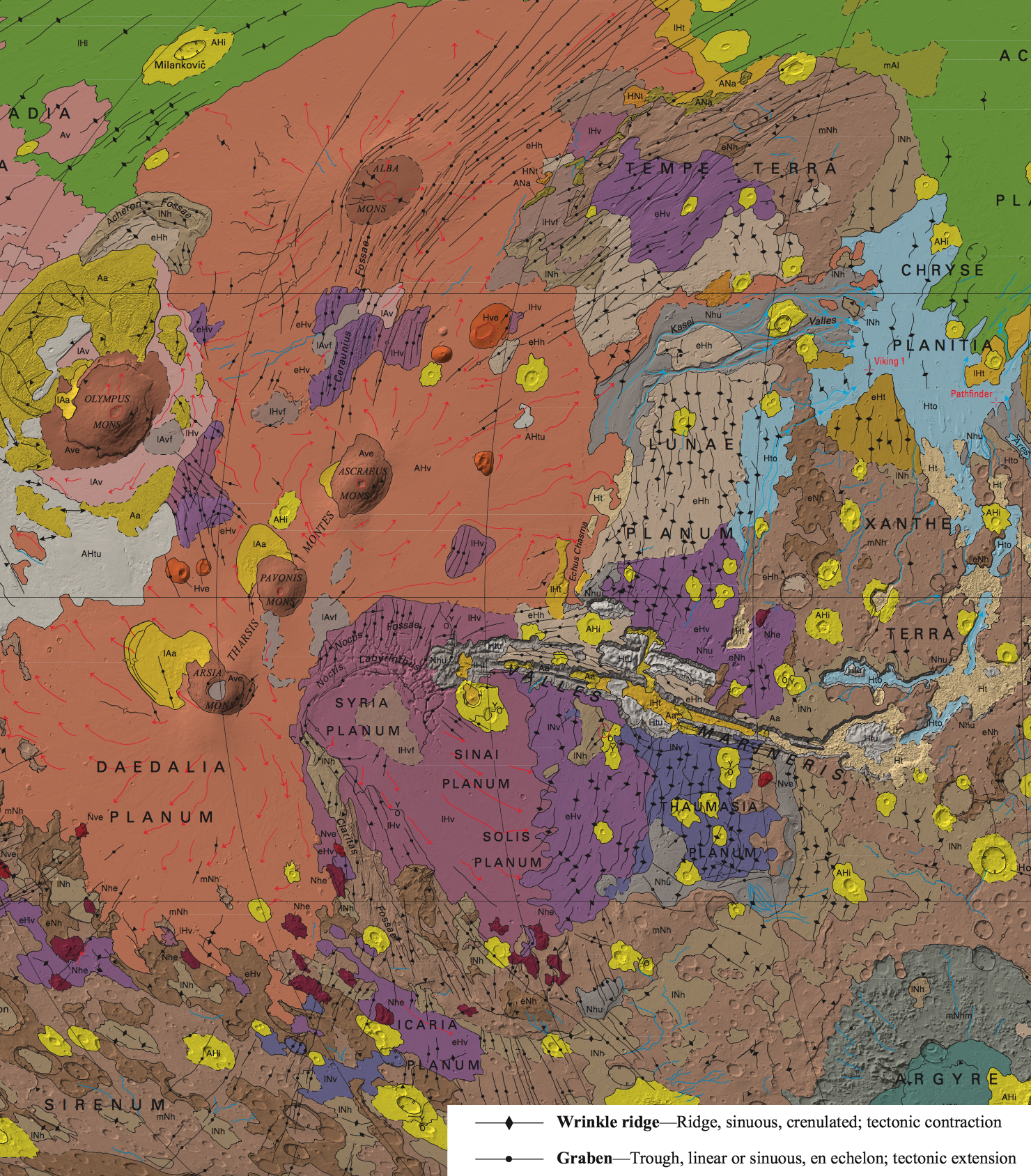
Geological map of the region around the Tharsis plateau. Extensional and compressional features – e.g., graben and wrinkle ridges – have been mapped and are visible in the image. (USGS, 2014).

The Tharsis plateau, which sits in the highland-lowland boundary, is an elevated region that covers roughly one quarter of the planet. Tharsis is topped by the largest shield volcanoes known in the Solar System. Olympus Mons stands 24 km tall and is nearly 600 km in diameter. The adjoining Tharsis Montes consists of Ascraeus, Pavonis, and Arsia. Alba Mons, at the northern end of the Tharsis plateau, is 1500 km in diameter, and stands 6 km above the surrounding plains. In comparison, Mauna Loa is merely 120 km wide but stands 9 km above the sea floor.

The load of Tharsis has had both regional and global influences. Extensional features radiating from Tharsis include graben several kilometers wide, and hundreds of meters deep, as well as enormous troughs and rifts up to 600 km wide and several kilometers deep. These graben and rifts are bounded by steeply dipping normal faults, and can extend for distances up to 4000 km. Their relief indicates that they accommodate small amounts of extension on the order of 100 m or less. It has been argued that these graben are surface expressions of deflated subsurface dikes.

Circumferential to Tharsis are so-called wrinkle ridges. These are compressional structures composed of linear asymmetric ridges that can be tens of kilometers wide and hundreds of kilometers long. Many aspects of these ridges appear to be consistent with terrestrial compressional features that involve surface folding overlying blind thrust faults at depth. Wrinkle ridges are believed to accommodate small amounts of shortening on the order of 100 m or less. Larger ridges and scarps have also been identified on Mars. These features can be several kilometers high (as opposed to hundreds of meters high for wrinkle ridges), and are thought to represent large lithosphere-scale thrust faults. Displacement ratios for these are ten times those of wrinkle ridges, with shortening estimated to be hundreds of meters to kilometers.

Approximately half of the extensional features on Mars formed during the Noachian, and have changed very little since, indicating that tectonic activity peaked early on and decreased with time. Wrinkle ridge formation both around Tharsis and in the eastern hemisphere is thought to have peaked in the Hesperian, likely due to global contraction attributed to cooling of the planet.

== Hemispheric dichotomy ==
=== Hypsometry ===
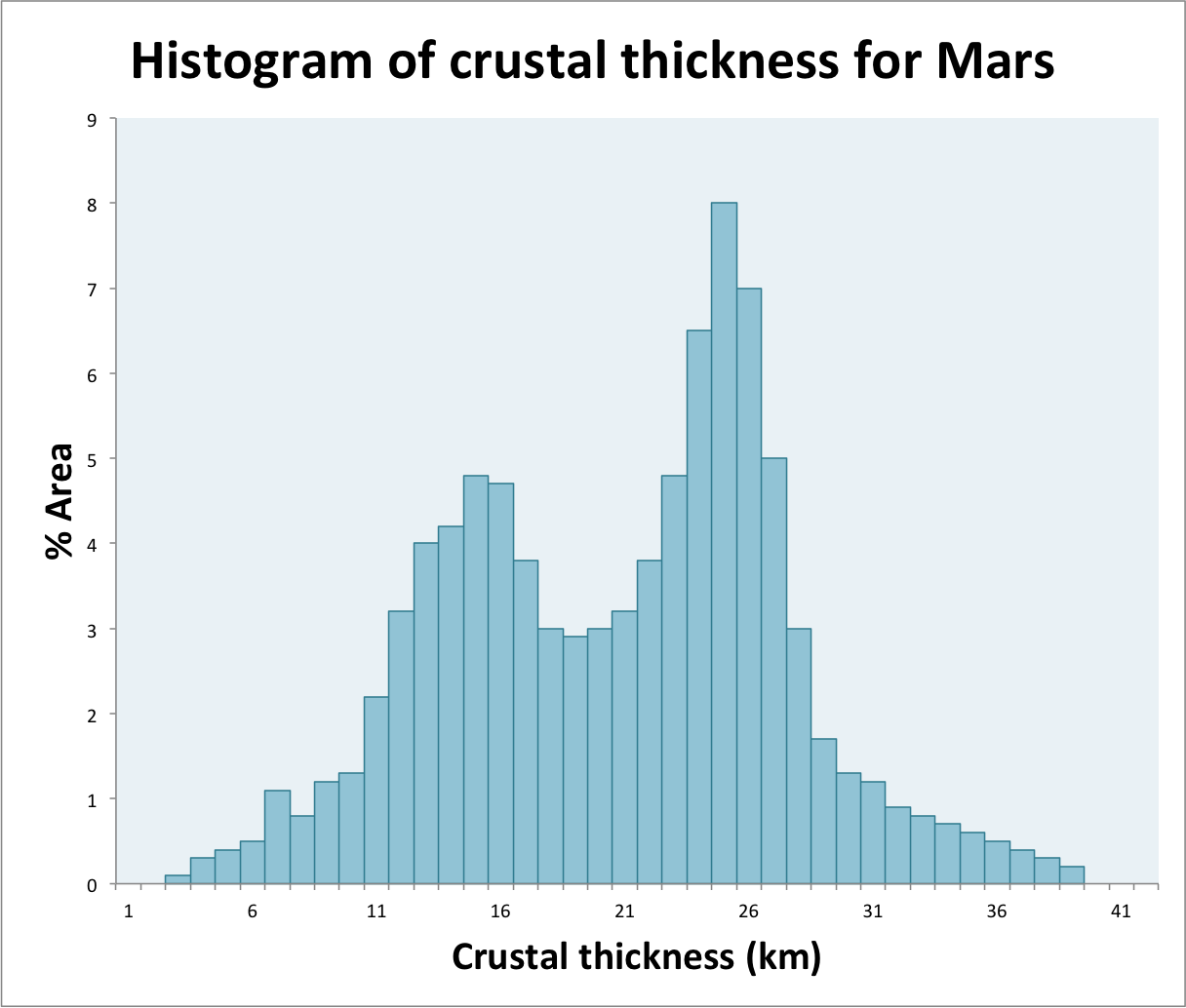
Histogram of crustal thickness versus area on Mars, adapted from Neumann et al., 2004. The hemispheric dichotomy is clear in the two peaks in the data.

Gravity and topography data show that crustal thickness on Mars is resolved into two major peaks, with modal thicknesses of 32 km and 58 km in the northern and southern hemispheres, respectively. Regionally, the thickest crust is associated with the Tharsis plateau, where crustal thickness in some areas exceeds 80 km, and the thinnest crust with impact basins. The major impact basins collectively make up a small histogram peak from 5 to 20 km.

The origin of the hemispheric dichotomy, which separates the northern plains from the southern highlands, has been subject to much debate. Important observations to take into account when considering its origin include the following: (1) The northern plains and southern highlands have distinct thicknesses, (2) the crust underlying the northern plains is essentially the same age as the crust of the southern highlands, and (3) the northern plains, unlike the southern highlands, contain sparse and weak magnetic anomalies. As will be discussed below, hypotheses for the formation of the dichotomy can largely be divided into endogenic and exogenic processes.

=== Endogenic origins ===
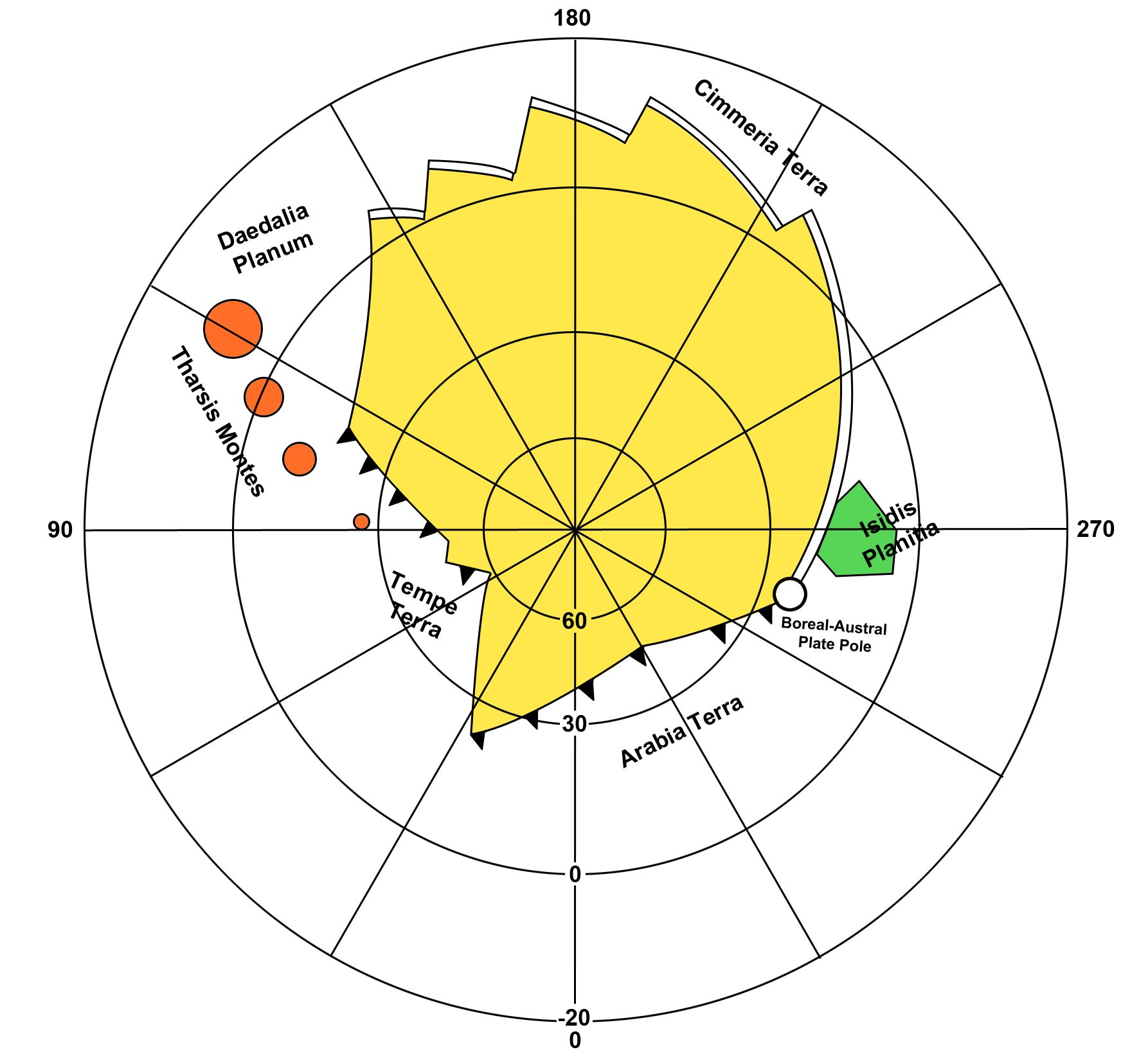
A possible plate tectonic explanation for the northern lowlands. The Boreal plate is shown in yellow. Trenches are shown by toothed lines, ridges by double lines, and transform faults by single lines, modified from Sleep, 1994.

Endogenic hypotheses include the possibility of a very early plate tectonic phase on Mars. Such a scenario suggests that the northern hemispheric crust is a relic oceanic plate. In the preferred reconstruction, a spreading center extended north of Terra Cimmeria between Daedalia Planum and Isidis Planitia. As spreading progressed, the Boreal plate broke into the Acidalia plate with south-dipping subducting beneath Arabia Terra, and the Ulysses plate with east-dipping subducting beneath Tempe Terra and Tharsis Montes. According to this reconstruction, the northern plains would have been generated by a single spreading ridge, with Tharsis Montes qualifying as an island arc. However, subsequent investigations of this model show a general lack of evidence for tectonism and volcanism in areas where such activity was initially predicted.

Another endogenic process used to explain the hemispheric dichotomy is that of primary crustal fractionation. This process would have been associated with the formation of the Martian core, which took place immediately after planetary accretion. Nevertheless, such an early origin of the hemispheric dichotomy is challenged by the fact that only minor magnetic anomalies have been detected in the northern plains.

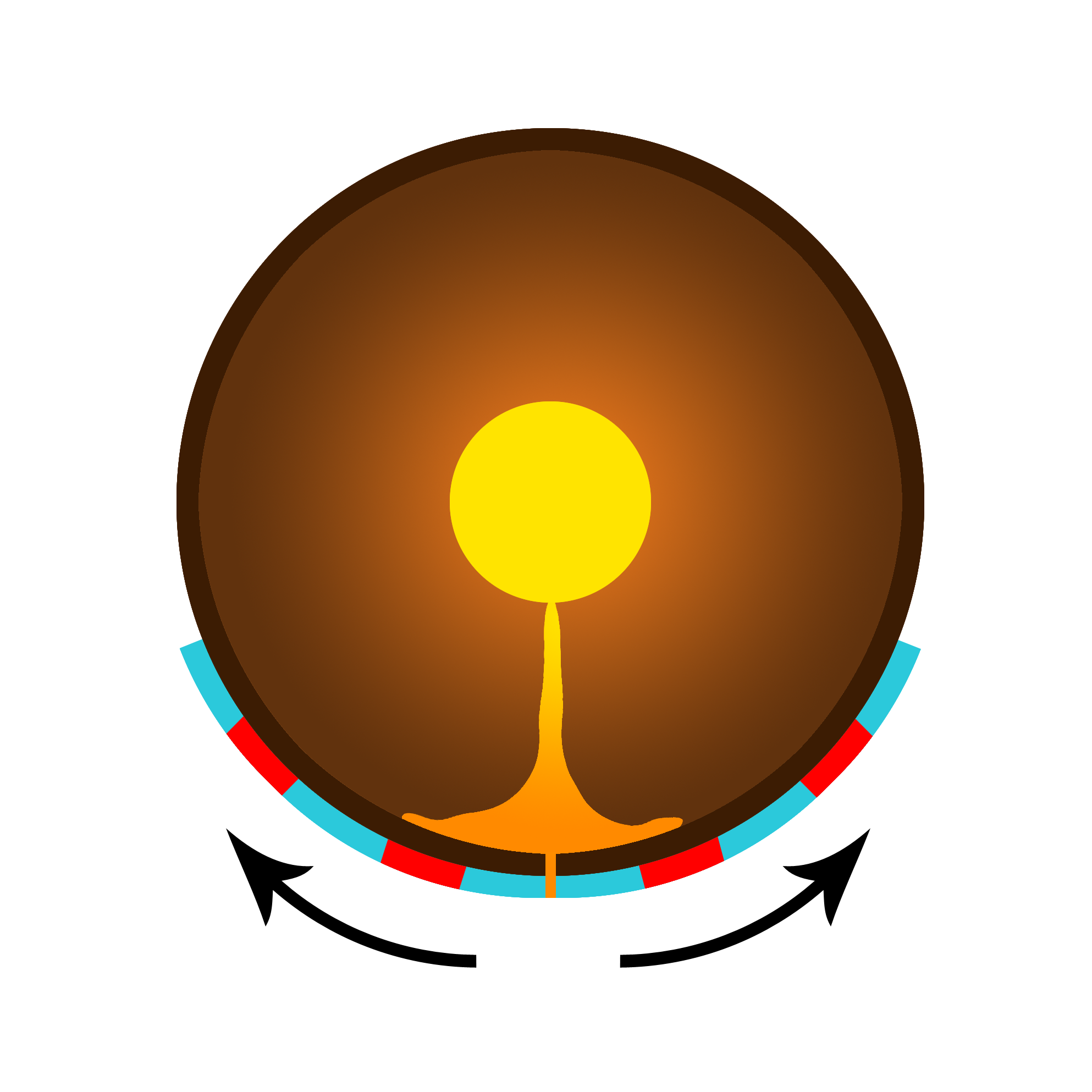
A model for a mantle plume origin for the hemispheric dichotomy. Single plume mantle convection generates new crust in southern hemisphere with alternating bands of normal and reversed remanent magnetism, adapted from Vita-Finzi & Fortes, 2013.

Single plume mantle convection has also been invoked to explain the hemispheric dichotomy. This process would have caused substantial melting and crustal production above a single rising mantle plume in the southern hemisphere, resulting in a thickened crust. It has also been suggested that the formation of a highly viscous melt layer beneath the thickened crust in the southern hemisphere could lead to lithospheric rotation. This may have resulted in the migration of volcanically active areas toward the dichotomy boundary, and the subsequent placement and formation of the Tharsis plateau. The single plume hypothesis is also used to explain the presence of magnetic anomalies in the southern hemisphere, and the lack thereof in the northern hemisphere.

=== Exogenic origins ===
Exogenic hypotheses involve one or more large impacts as being responsible for the lowering of the northern plains. Although a multiple-impact origin has been proposed, it would have required an improbable preferential bombardment of the northern hemisphere. It is also unlikely that multiple impacts would have been able to strip ejecta from the northern hemisphere, and uniformly strip the crust to a relatively consistent depth of 3 km.

Mapping of the northern plains and the dichotomy boundary shows that the crustal dichotomy is elliptical in shape. This suggests that formation of the northern plains was caused by a single oblique mega-impact. This hypothesis is in agreement with numerical models of impacts in the 30-60° range, which are shown to produce elliptical boundary basins similar to the structure identified on Mars. Demagnetization resulting from the high heat associated with such an impact can also serve to explain the apparent lack of magnetic anomalies in the northern plains. It also explains the younger surface age of the northern plains, as determined by significantly lesser crater density. Overall, this hypothesis appears to fare better than others that have been proposed.

== Tectonic implications of magnetic anomalies ==
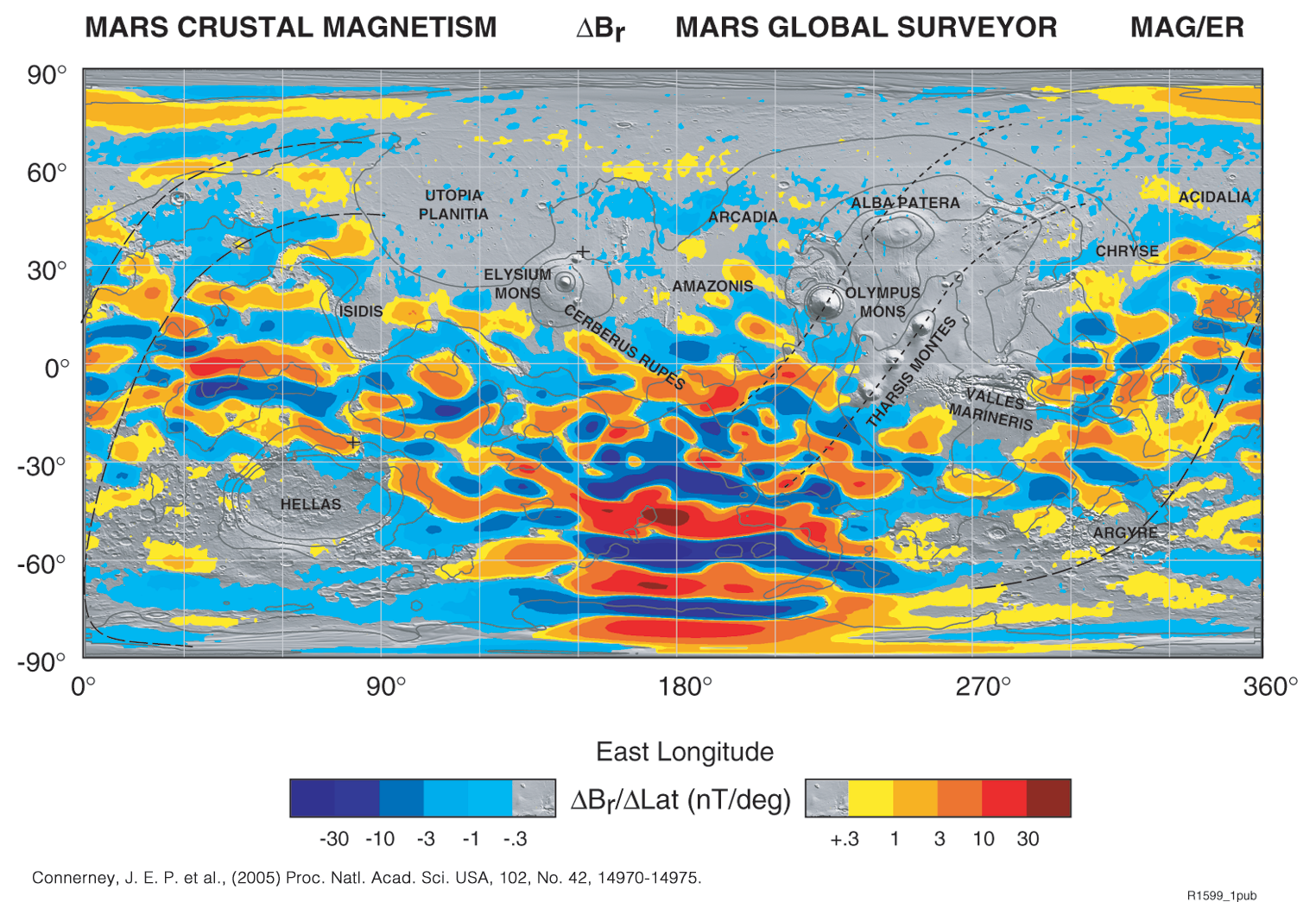
Map of crustal magnetic anomaly distribution on Mars, courtesy of NASA, 2005.

The southern highlands of Mars display zones of intense crustal magnetization. The magnetic anomalies are weak or absent in the vicinity of large impact basins, the northern plains, and in volcanic regions, indicating that magnetization in these areas have been erased by thermal events. The presence of magnetic anomalies on Mars suggests that the planet maintained an intrinsic magnetic field early on in its history. The anomalies are linear in shape and of alternating polarity, which some authors have interpreted as a sequence of reversals and a process akin to seafloor spreading. The stripes are ten times wider than those found on Earth, indicating faster spreading or slower reversal rates. Although no spreading center has been identified, a map of the magnetic anomalies on Mars reveals that the lineations are concentric to the south pole.

=== Mantle plume origin ===
A process similar to seafloor spreading has been proposed to explain the presence of the concentric stripes around the Martian south pole. The process is that of a single large mantle plume rising in one hemisphere and downwelling in the opposite hemisphere. In such a process, new crust produced would be emplaced in concentric circles spreading radially from a single upwelling point, consistent with the pattern observed on Mars. This process has also been invoked to help explain the Martian hemispheric dichotomy.

=== Dike intrusion origin ===
An alternative hypothesis claims that the magnetic anomalies on Mars are the result of successive dike intrusions due to lithospheric extension. As each dike intrusion cools, it would acquire thermoremanent magnetization from the planet's magnetic field. Successive dikes would be magnetized in the same direction, until the magnetic field reverses its polarity, resulting in the subsequent intrusions recording the opposite direction. These periodic reversals would require that the dike intrusions migrate over time.

=== Accretion of terranes ===
Another study assumes a process of crustal convergence instead of generation, arguing that the magnetic lineations on Mars formed at a convergent plate margin through collision and accretion of terranes. This hypothesis suggests that the magnetic lineations on Mars are analogous to the banded magnetic anomalies in the North American Cordillera on Earth. These terrestrial anomalies are of similar geometry and size as those detected on Mars, with widths of 100–200 km.

== Tectonic implications of Valles Marineris ==
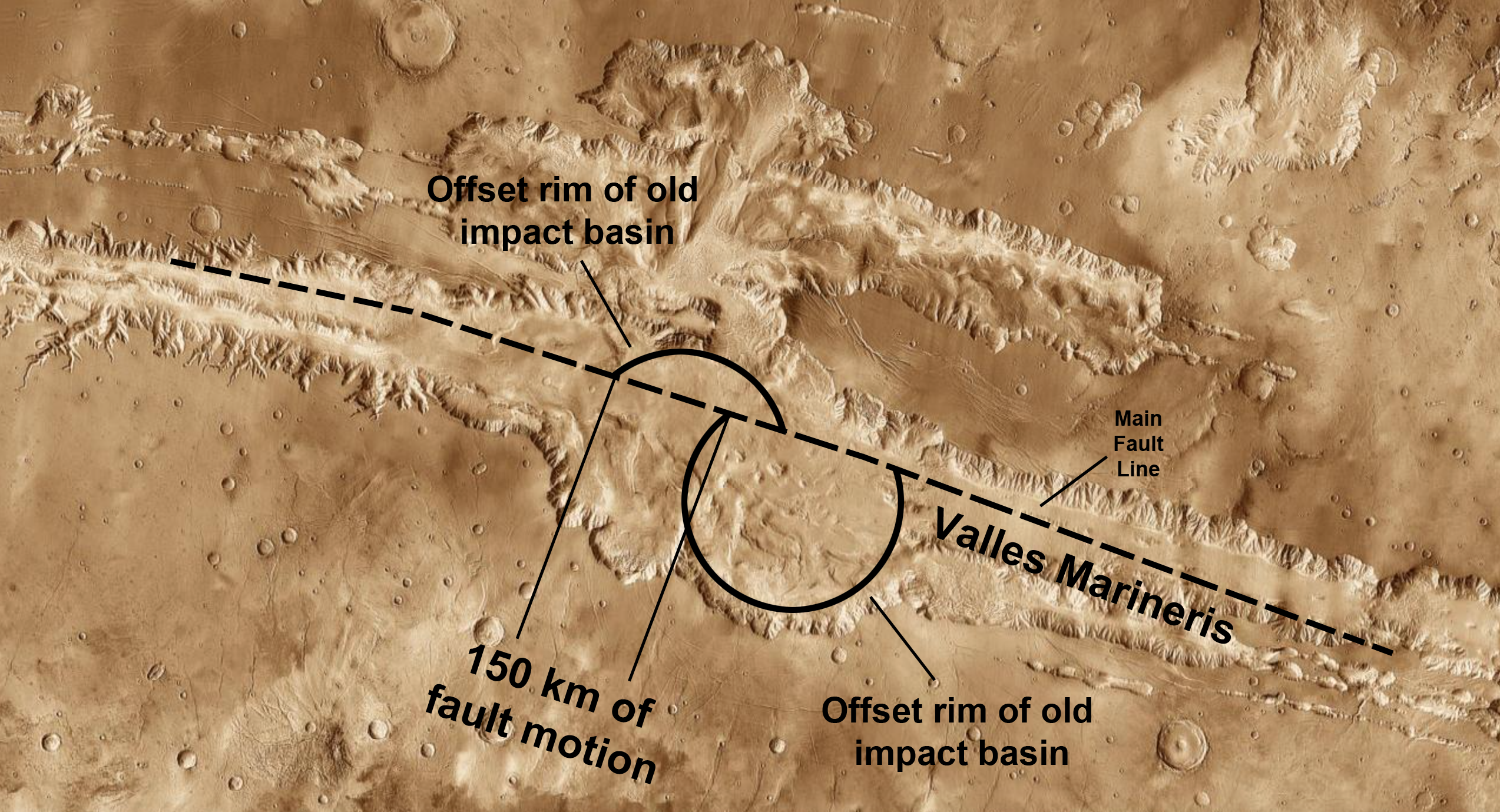
Satellite imagery of the Valles Marineris trough system, showing an interpreted large scale strike-slip fault system running along its length. Relative fault motion is suggested in part by the offset rim of an old impact basin. Image modified from NASA/MOLA Science Team.

Recent research claims to have found the first strong evidence for a plate tectonic boundary on Mars. The discovery refers to a large-scale (>2000 km in length and >150 km in slip) and quite narrow (<50 km wide) strike-slip fault zone in the Valles Marineris trough system, referred to as the Ius-Melas-Coprates fault zone (Fig. 7). The Valles Marineris trough system, which is over 4000 km long, 600 km wide, and up to 7 km deep, would, if located on Earth, extend all the way across North America.

The study indicates that the Ius-Melas-Coprates fault zone is a left-slip transtensional system similar to that of the Dead Sea fault zone on Earth. The magnitude of displacement across the fault zone is estimated to be 150–160 km, as indicated by the offset rim of an old impact basin. If normalizing the magnitude of the slip to the surface area of the planet, the Ius-Melas-Coprates fault zone has a displacement value significantly larger than that of the Dead Sea Fault, and slightly larger than that of the San Andreas Fault. The lack of significant deformation on both sides of the Ius-Melas-Coprates fault zone over a distance of 500 km suggests that the regions bounded by the fault behave as rigid blocks. This evidence essentially points to a large strike-slip system at a plate boundary, in terrestrial terms known as a transform fault.

== See also ==
- Crustal magnetism
- Marsquake
