= Melas Chasma =

Chasma on Mars

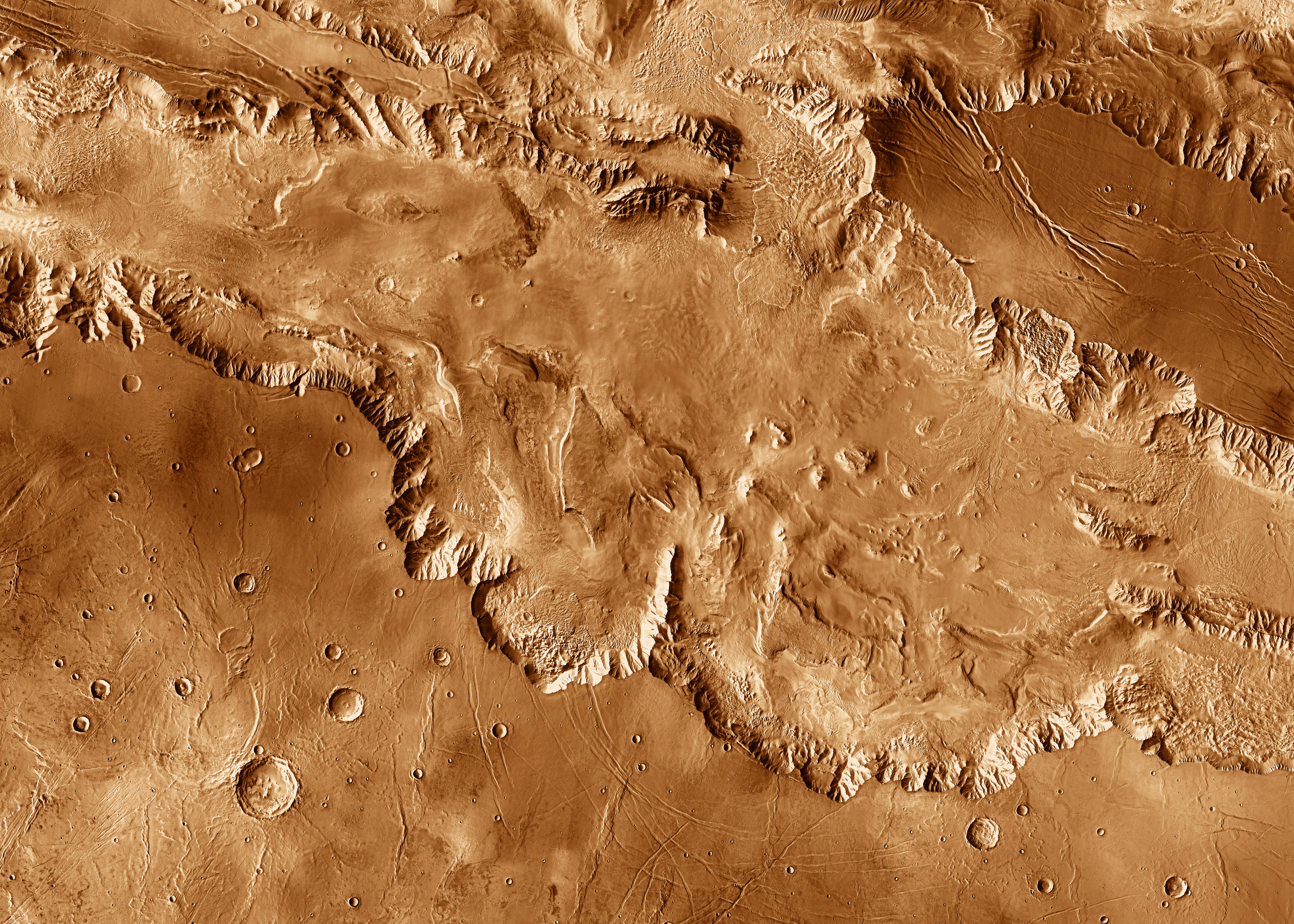
- Melas Chasma in mosaic of THEMIS infrared images, with parts of Ius, Candor and Coprates chasmata visible at the upper left, top and lower right, respectively. Enormous landslide deposits are visible near the junctions of Melas Chasma with each of the neighboring chasmata. Numerous graben ("fossae") and ridges ("dorsa") stretch across the plateau outside the canyons' rims.
- Coordinates: 10.4°S 72.7°W
- Length: 547.0 km

Melas Chasma /ˈmiːləs ˈkæzmə/ is a canyon on Mars, the widest segment of the Valles Marineris canyon system, located east of Ius Chasma at 9.8°S, 283.6°E in Coprates quadrangle. It cuts through layered deposits that are thought to be sediments from an old lake that resulted from runoff of the valley networks to the west. Other theories include windblown sediment deposits and volcanic ash. Support for abundant, past water in Melas Chasma is the discovery by MRO of hydrated sulfates. In addition, sulfate and iron oxides were found by the same satellite. Although not chosen as one of the finalists, it was one of eight potential landing sites for the Mars 2020 rover, a mission with a focus on astrobiology.

The floor of Melas Chasma is about 70% younger massive material that is thought to be volcanic ash whipped up by the wind into eolian features. It also contains rough floor material from the erosion of the canyon walls. Around the edges of Melas is also much slide material.

In a recent study of southwestern Melas Chasma using high-resolution image, topographic and spectral datasets eleven fan-shaped landforms were found. These fans add to growing evidence that Melas Chasma once held a lake that had fluctuating levels.

Using HiRISE images, CTX images, and DEM's, a team of researchers mapped many channels and inverted channels in Melas Chasma. A digital elevation model (DEM) is a digital model or 3D representation of a terrain's surface. In addition, they found dendritic networks of channels in the plateaus just above the Chasma. Channels appeared to have formed at different times, hence there were "wet-dry" phases in the history of Melas Chasma. The whole region may have had liquid water for extended periods in the early Hesperian.

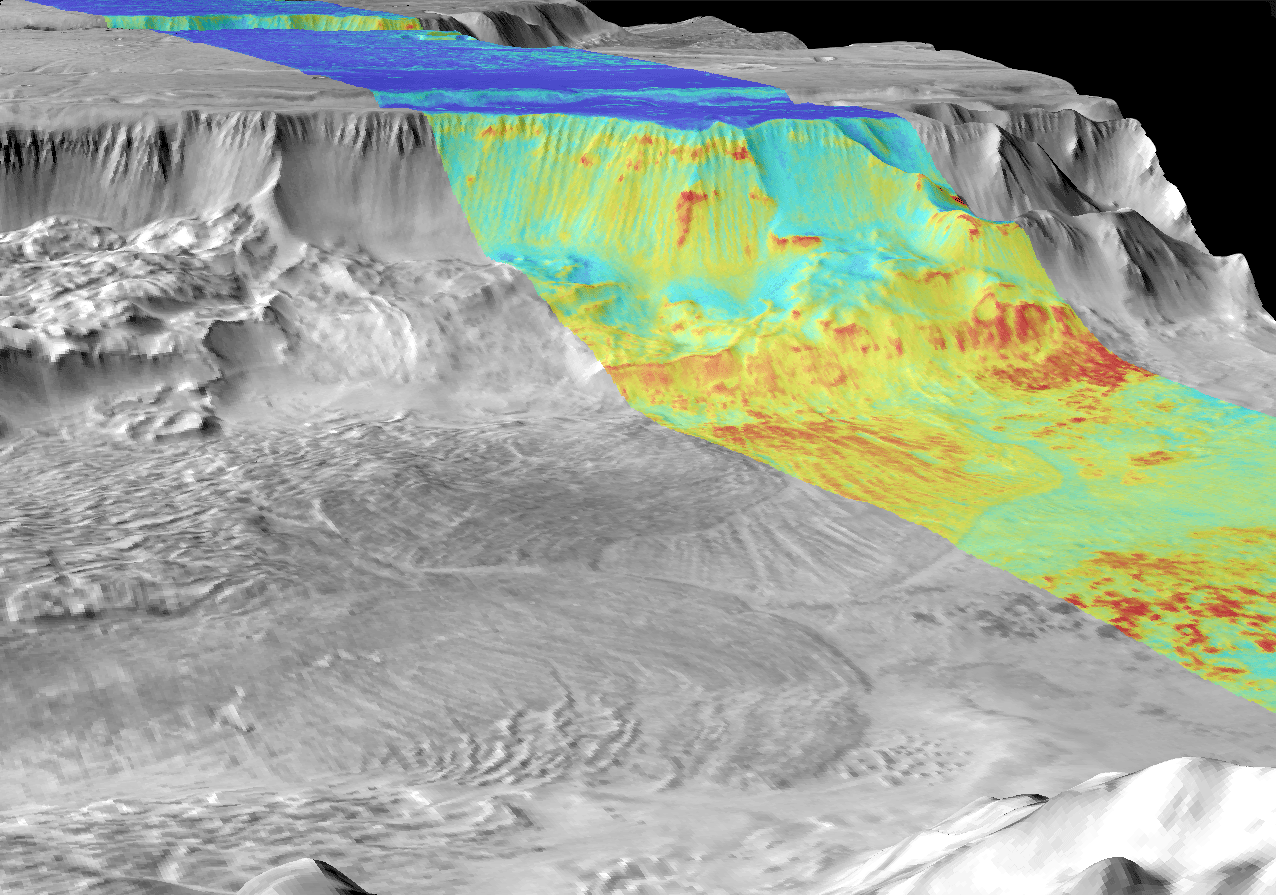
Combined infrared and daytime observation of Melas Chasma. The shadowed regions (blue) indicate successive landslides.

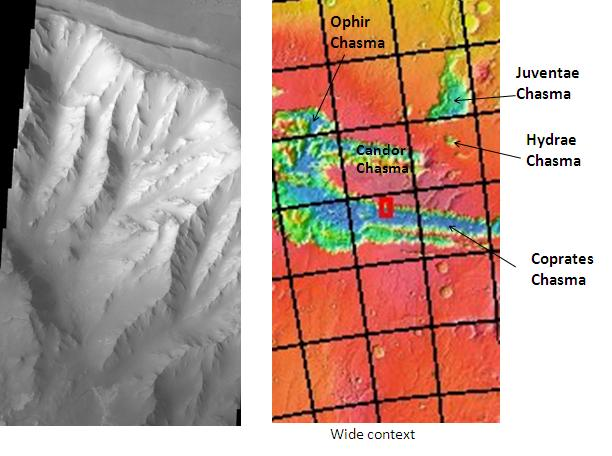
Cliff in Melas Chasma, as seen by THEMIS. Click on image to see relationship of Melas to other features.

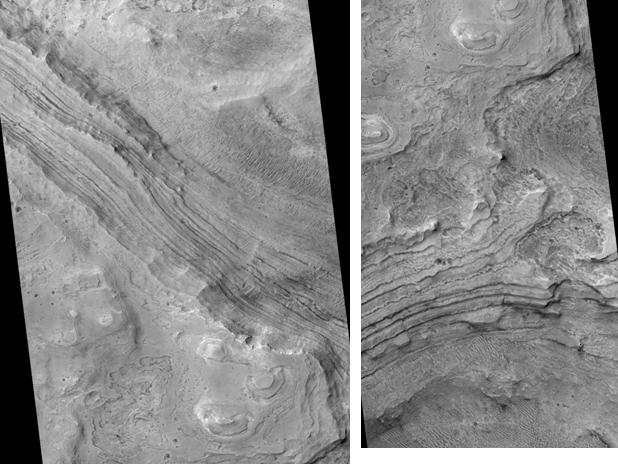
Two views of Melas Chasma Layered Deposits, as seen by HiRISE. Left picture lies north of other picture on the right. Pictures are not the same scale. Click on image to see details of layers.

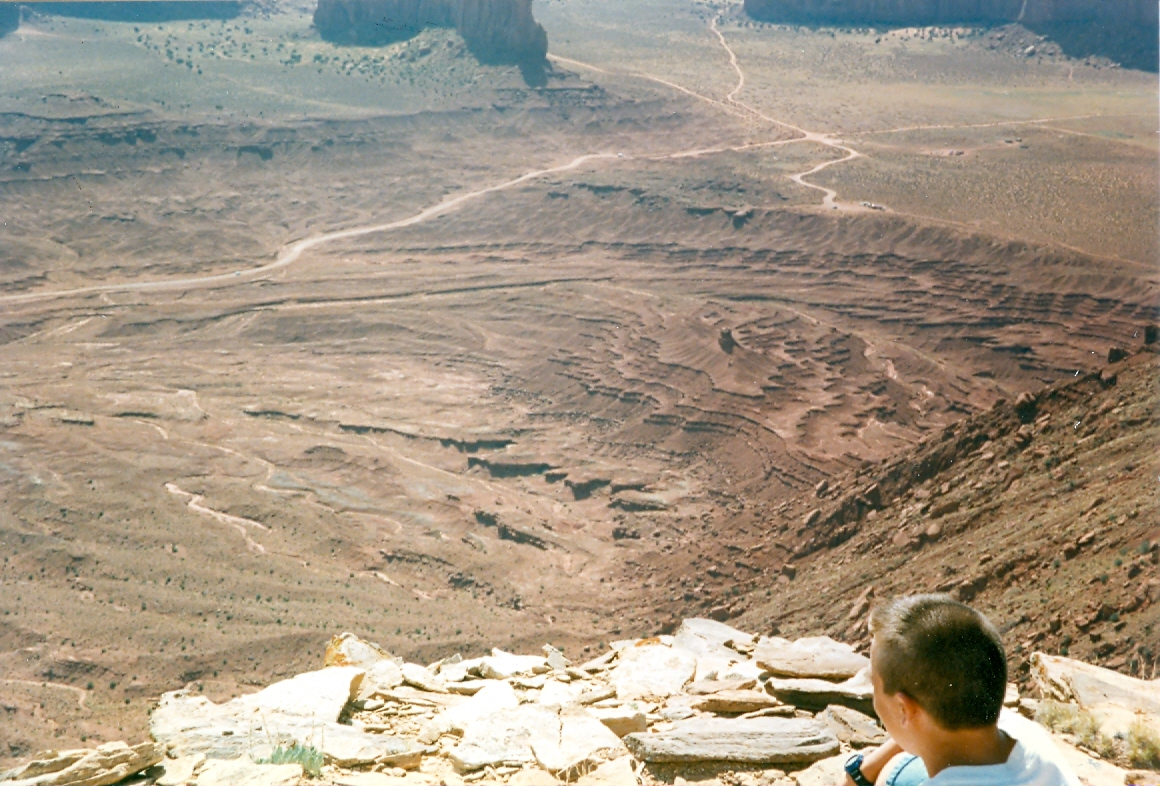
Layers in Monument Valley. These are accepted as being formed, at least in part, by water deposition. Since Mars contains similar layers, water remains as a major cause of layering on Mars.

== See also ==
- Chasma
- Coprates quadrangle
- Digital elevation model
- Geology of Mars
- HiRISE
- Inverted relief
- Lakes on Mars
