= Eos Chasma =

Chasma on Mars

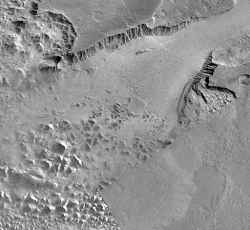
- The eastern portion of Eos Chasma
- Coordinates: 12.1°S 39.7°W
- Length: 1,413 km

Eos Chasma is a chasma in the southern part of the Valles Marineris canyon system of the Coprates quadrangle and the Margaritifer Sinus quadrangles of the planet Mars.

Eos Chasma’s western floor is mainly composed of an etched massive material composed of either volcanic or eolian deposits later eroded by the Martian wind. The eastern end of the Eos chasma has a large area of streamlined bars and longitudinal striations. This is interpreted to be stream-carved plateau deposits and material transported and deposited by flowing fluid. Ganges Chasma is an offshoot of Eos Chasma. MRO discovered sulfate, hydrated sulfate, and iron oxides in Eos Chasma.

According to an analysis by Vicky Hamilton of the University of Hawaii, Eos Chasma may be the source of the ALH84001 meteorite, which some believe to be evidence of past life on Mars. However, the analysis was not conclusive, in part because it was limited to parts of Mars not obscured by dust.

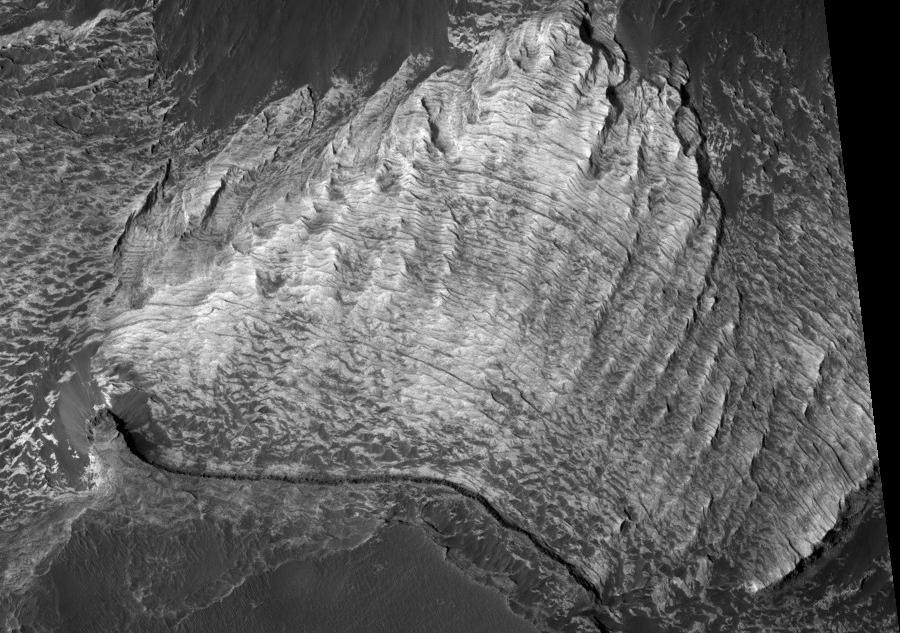
Eos Chaos—lies at southern edge of Eos Chasma, as seen by HiRISE. To see many fine layers click on image.

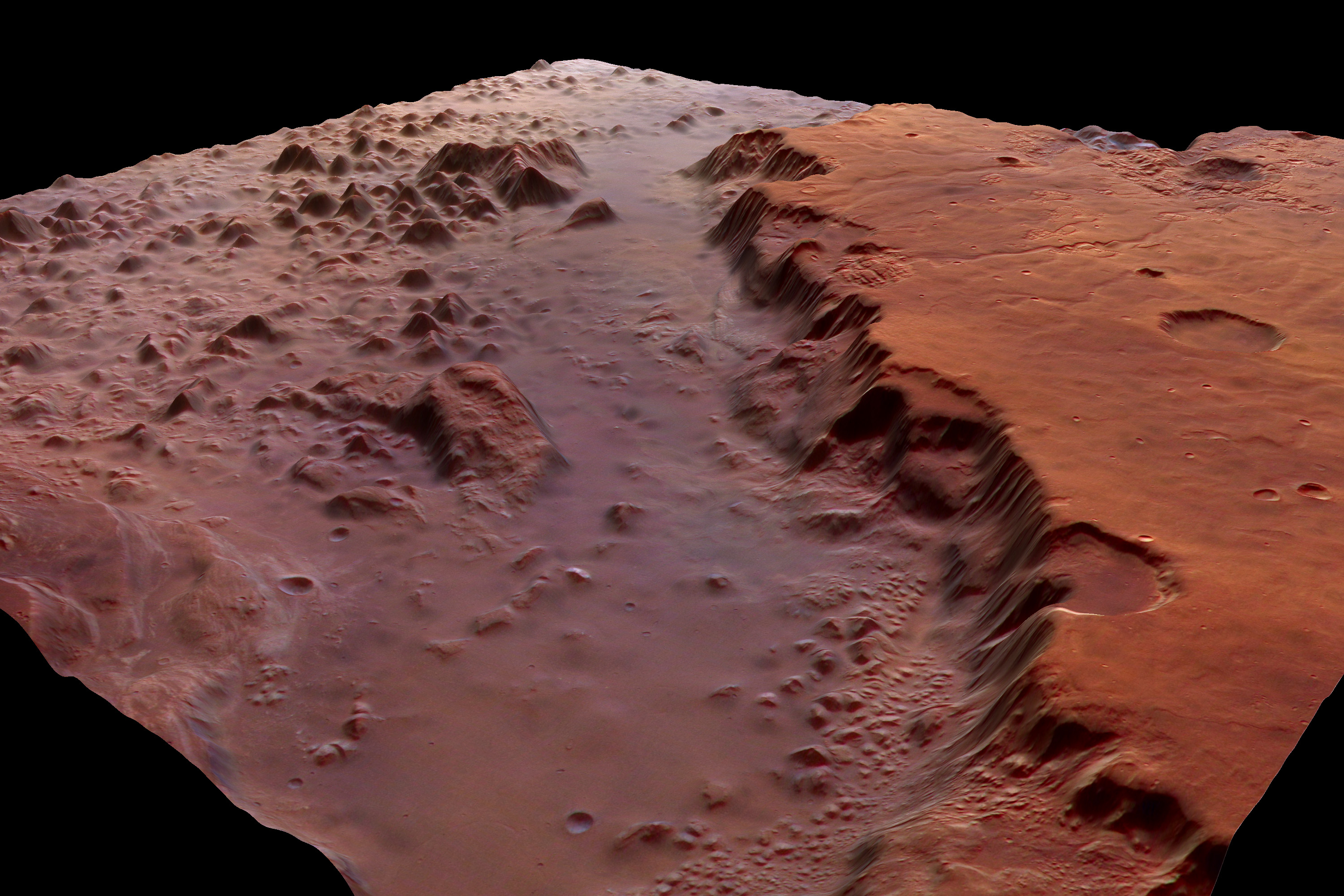
Eos Chasma

== See also ==
- Chasma
- Coprates quadrangle
- Geography of Mars
- Geology of Mars
- HiRISE
