= Candor Chasma =

Chasma on Mars

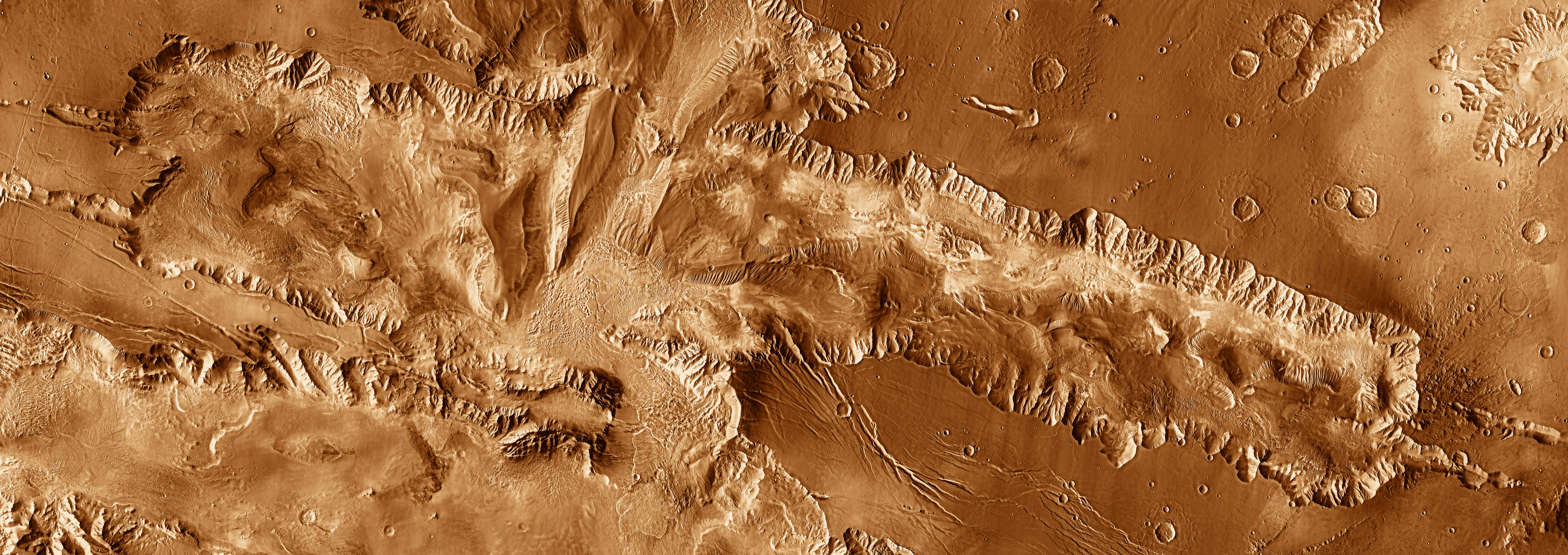
- Candor Chasma in mosaic of THEMIS infrared images, with parts of Ophir, Melas and Juventae chasmata at top, lower left and extreme upper right, respectively. Massive landslide deposits, the Melas Labes, are visible near the junction of Candor and Melas chasmata at bottom, just left of center.
- Coordinates: 6.6°S 70.9°W
- Length: 773.238

Candor Chasma is one of the largest canyons in the Valles Marineris canyon system on Mars. The feature is geographically divided into two halves: East and West Candor Chasmas, respectively. It is unclear how the canyon originally formed; one theory is that it was expanded and deepened by tectonic processes similar to a graben, while another suggests that it was formed by subsurface water erosion similar to a karst. MRO discovered sulfates, hydrated sulfates, and iron oxides in Candor Chasma.

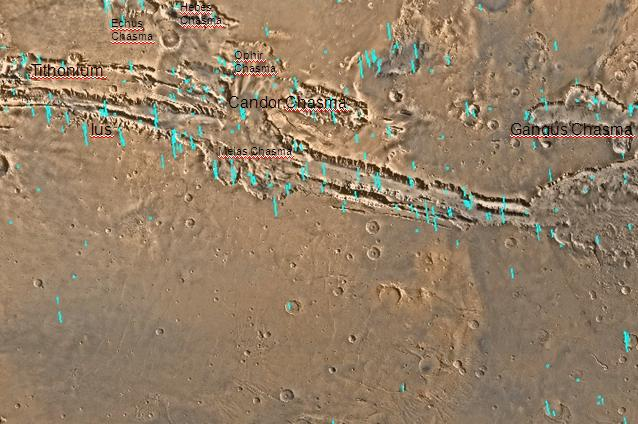
Map of Coprates quadrangle showing details of Valles Marineris, the largest canyon system in the Solar System. Some of the canyons may have once been filled with water. Candor Chasma is in the middle.

One of the pictures below shows branched channels. Many places on Mars show channels of different sizes. Many of these channels probably carried water, at least for a time. The climate of Mars may have been such in the past that water ran on its surface. It has been known for some time that Mars undergoes many large changes in its tilt or obliquity because its two small moons lack the gravity to stabilize it, as the Moon stabilizes Earth; at times the tilt of Mars has even been greater than 80 degrees

== Gallery ==
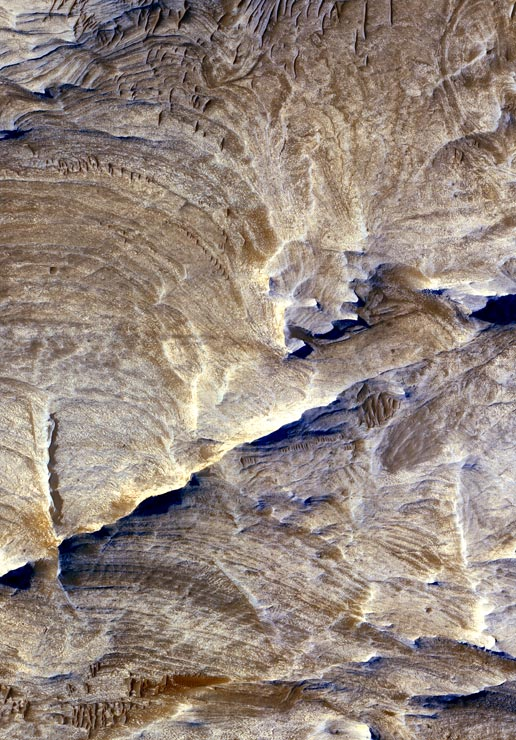
Tectonic fractures in Candor Chasma as seen by HiRISE

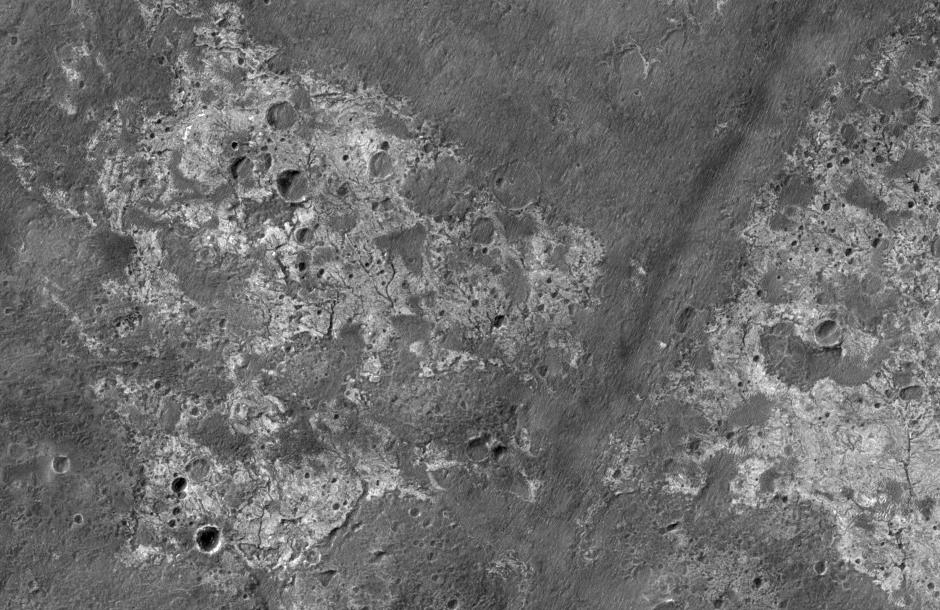
Channels in Candor plateau, as seen by HiRISE. Location is Coprates quadrangle. Click on image to see many small, branched channels which are strong evidence for sustained precipitation.

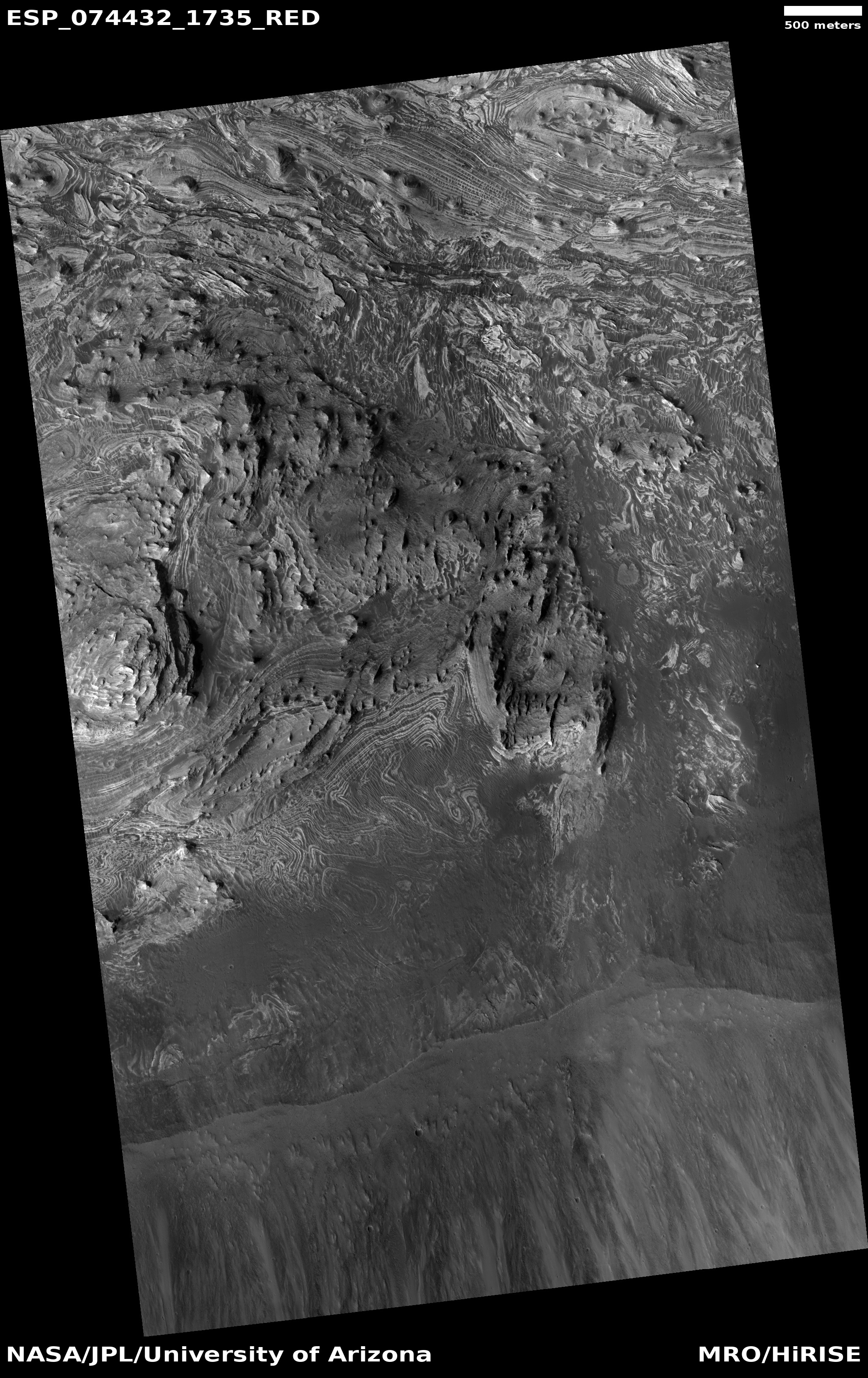
Wide view of layers in Candor, as seen by HiRISE. This picture was named HiRISE picture of the day for November 9, 2023.

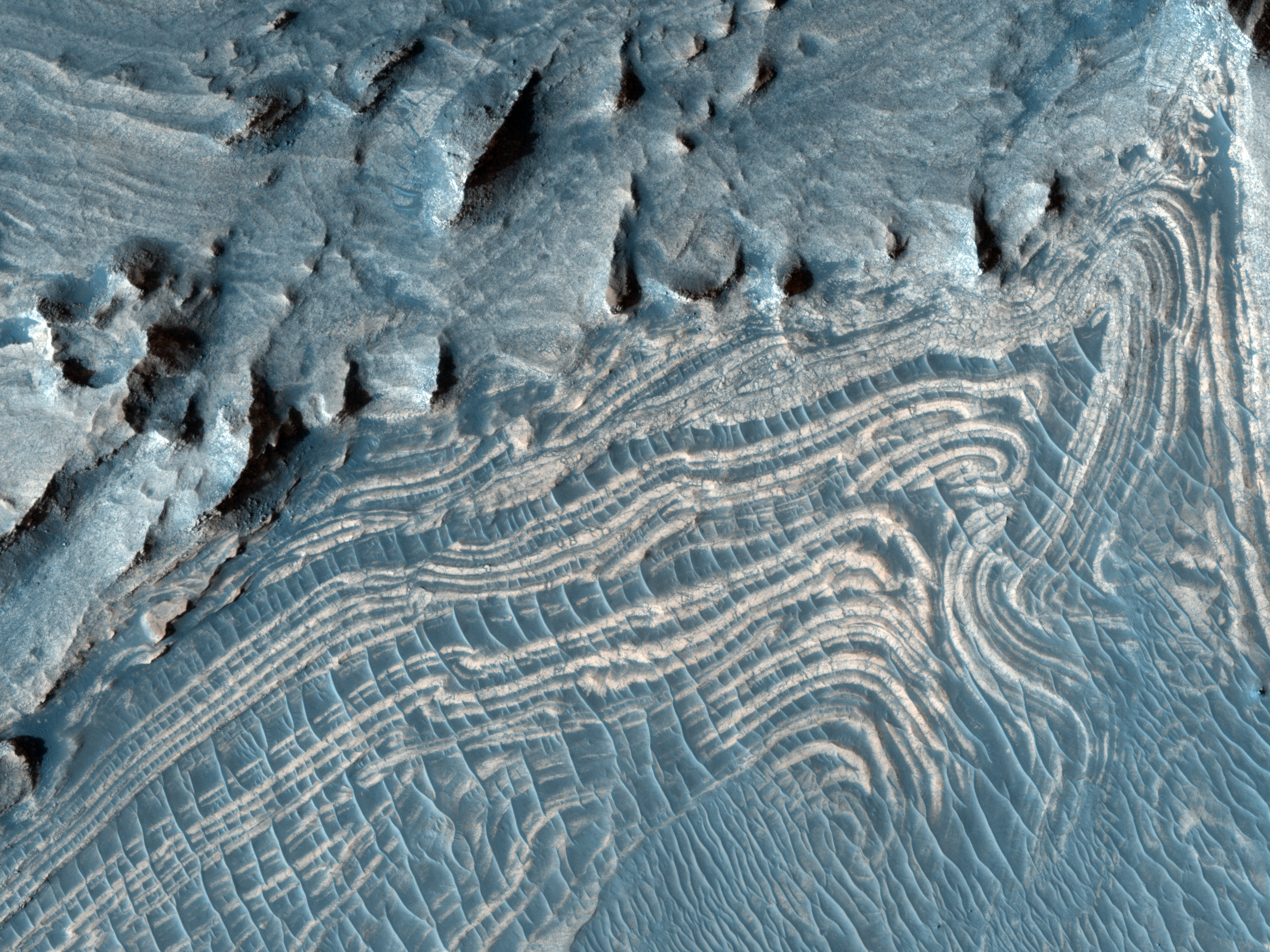
Close view of layers in Candor. Image has been processed in color to bring out more detail. It was named HiRISE picture of the day for November 9, 2023.

== See also ==
- Chasma
