= Valles Marineris =

Valley system on Mars

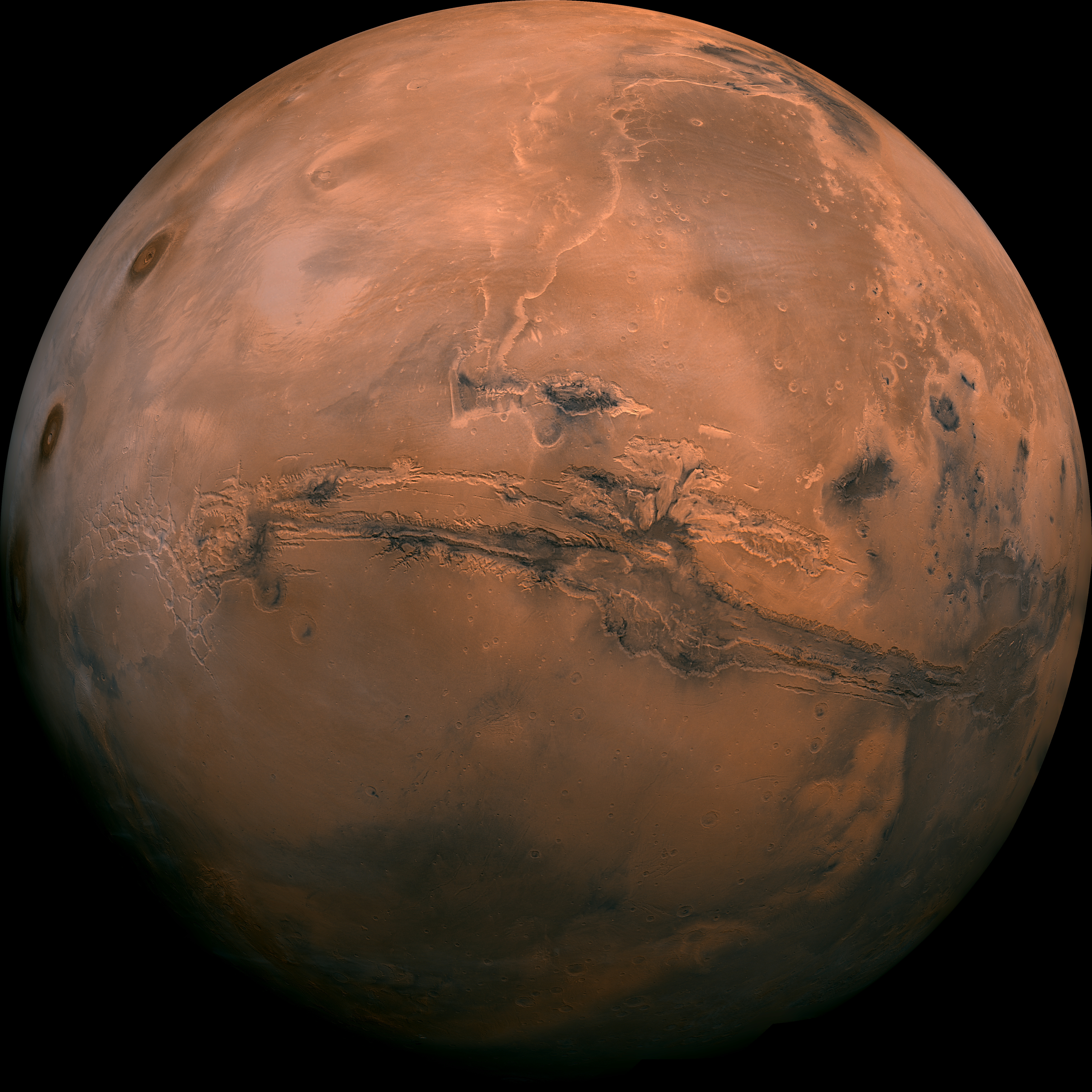
- Valles Marineris stretches over 4,000 km (2,500 mi) across Mars, mostly east-west just below the equator, as seen in this Viking 1 orbiter image mosaic.
- Feature type: Fault system
- Coordinates: 13.9°S 59.2°W
- Length: over 4,000 km (2,500 mi)
- Naming: Mariner 9

Valles Marineris (/ˈvælɪs mærɪˈnɛərɪs/; Latin for Mariner Valleys, named after the Mariner 9 Mars orbiter of 1971–72 which discovered it) is a system of canyons that runs along the Martian surface east of the Tharsis region. At more than 4,000 km (2,500 mi) long, 200 km (120 mi) wide and up to 7 km (23,000 ft) deep, Valles Marineris is the largest canyon in the Solar System.

Valles Marineris is located along the equator of Mars, on the east side of the Tharsis Bulge, and stretches for nearly a quarter of the planet's circumference. The canyon system starts in the west with Noctis Labyrinthus; proceeding to the east are Tithonium and Ius chasmata, then Melas, Candor and Ophir chasmata, then Coprates Chasma, then Ganges, Capri and Eos chasmata; finally it empties into an outflow channel region containing chaotic terrain that ends in the basin of Chryse Planitia.

It has been recently suggested that Valles Marineris is a large tectonic "crack" in the Martian crust. Most researchers agree that this formed as the crust thickened in the Tharsis region to the west, and was subsequently widened by erosion. Near the eastern flanks of the rift, there appear to be channels that may have been formed by water or carbon dioxide. It has also been proposed that Valles Marineris is a large channel formed by the erosion of lava flowing from the flank of Pavonis Mons.

== Formation ==
The most agreed upon theory today is that Valles Marineris was formed by rift faults, later enlarged by erosion and collapsing of the rift walls, similar to how the East African Rift was formed. The formation of Valles Marineris is thought to be closely tied with the formation of the Tharsis Bulge. The Tharsis Bulge was formed from the Noachian to Late Hesperian period of Mars, in three stages.

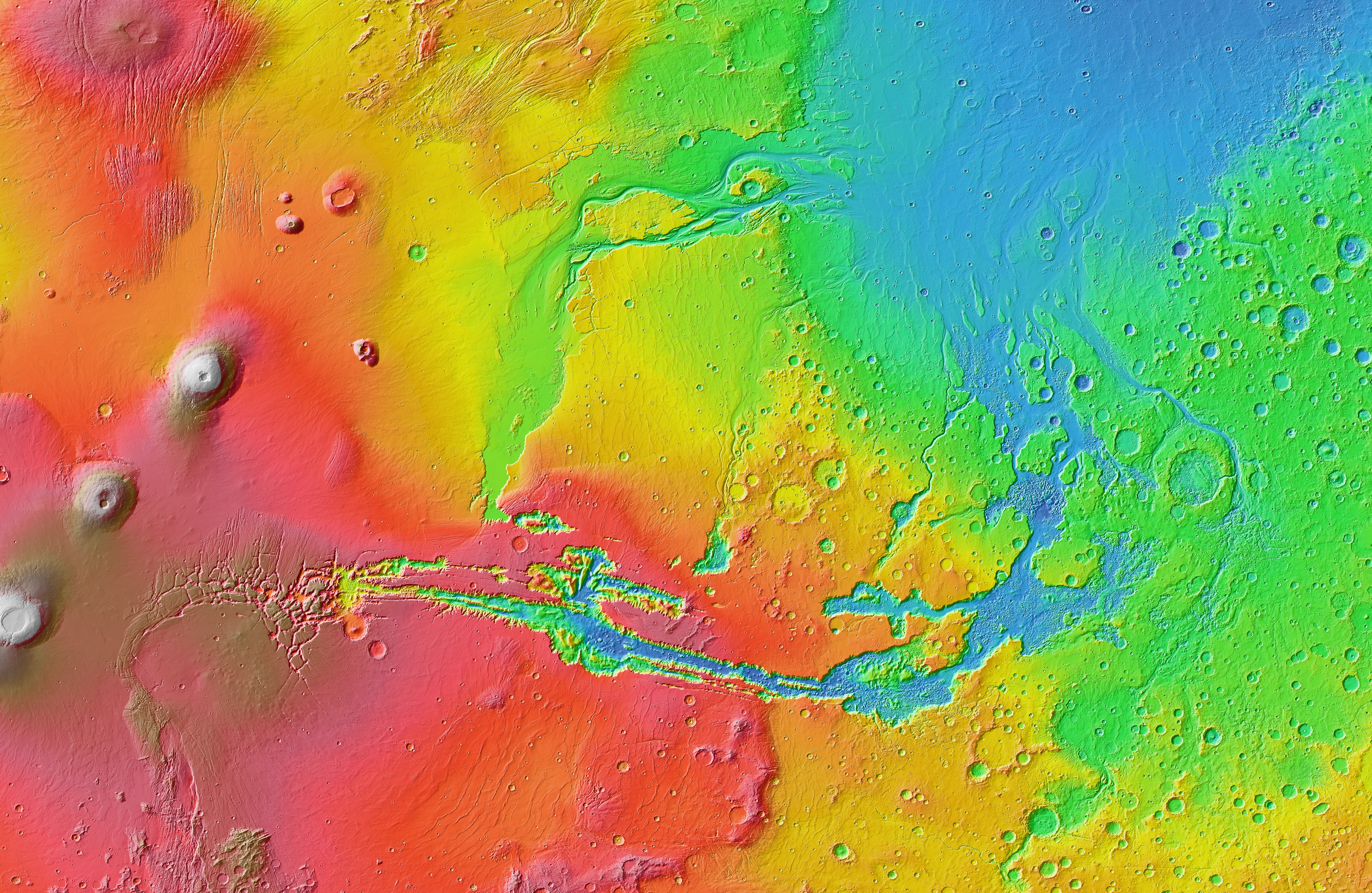
Topographic map of Valles Marineris with its associated outflow channels and their surroundings, based on MOLA altimetry data

The first stage consisted of a combination of volcanism and isostatic uplift; soon, however, the volcanism loaded the crust to a point at which the crust could no longer support the added weight of Tharsis, leading to widespread graben formation in the elevated regions of Tharsis. The second stage consisted of more volcanism and a loss of isostatic equilibrium; the source regions of the volcanism no longer resided underneath Tharsis, creating a very large load. Finally, the crust failed to hold up Tharsis and radial fractures formed, including at Valles Marineris. The third stage mainly consisted of more volcanism and asteroid impacts. The crust, having already reached its failure point, just stayed in place and younger volcanoes formed. Tharsis volcanism involved very low viscosity magma, forming shield volcanoes similar to those of the Hawaiian Island chain, but, because there is minor or no current active plate tectonics on Mars, the hotspot activity led to very long histories of repeated volcanic eruptions at the same spots, creating some of the largest volcanoes in the solar system, including the biggest, Olympus Mons.

Landslides have left numerous deposits on the floor of Valles Marineris and contributed to widening it. Possible triggers of landslides are quakes caused by tectonic activity or impact events. Both types of events release seismic waves that accelerate the ground at and below the surface. Mars is much less tectonically active than Earth, and marsquakes are unlikely to have provided seismic waves of the required magnitude. Most sizable craters on Mars date to the Late Heavy Bombardment, 4.1 to 3.8 billion years ago (the Noachian period), and are older than the landslide deposits in Valles Marineris. However, three craters (including the crater Oudemans) have been identified, on the basis of their proximity and later dates, as ones whose formation may have caused some of the landslides.

Valles Marineris in mosaic of THEMIS infrared images from 2001 Mars Odyssey

=== Former formation hypotheses ===
Hypotheses about the formation of Valles Marineris have changed over the years. Ideas in the 1970s were erosion by water or thermokarst activity. Thermokarst activity may have contributed, but erosion by water is a problematic mechanism because liquid water cannot exist in most current Martian surface conditions, which typically experience about 1% of Earth's atmospheric pressure and a temperature range of 148 K (−125 °C; −193 °F) to 310 K (37 °C; 98 °F). Many scientists however agree that liquid water flowed on the Martian surface in the past, when atmospheric conditions were different. Valles Marineris may have been enlarged by flowing water at that time. Another hypothesis by McCauley in 1972 was that the canyons formed by withdrawal of subsurface magma. Around 1989, a formation hypothesis by tensional fracturing was proposed.

== Regions of Valles Marineris ==
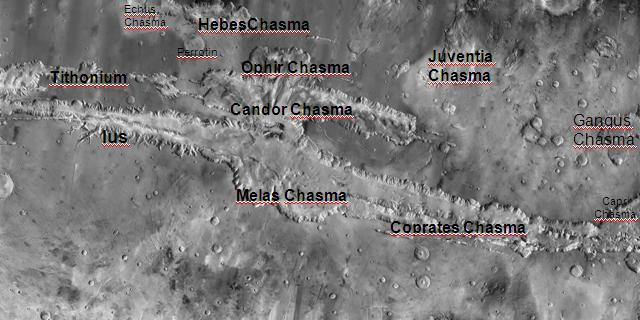
Valles Marineris with major features labeled

=== Noctis Labyrinthus ===
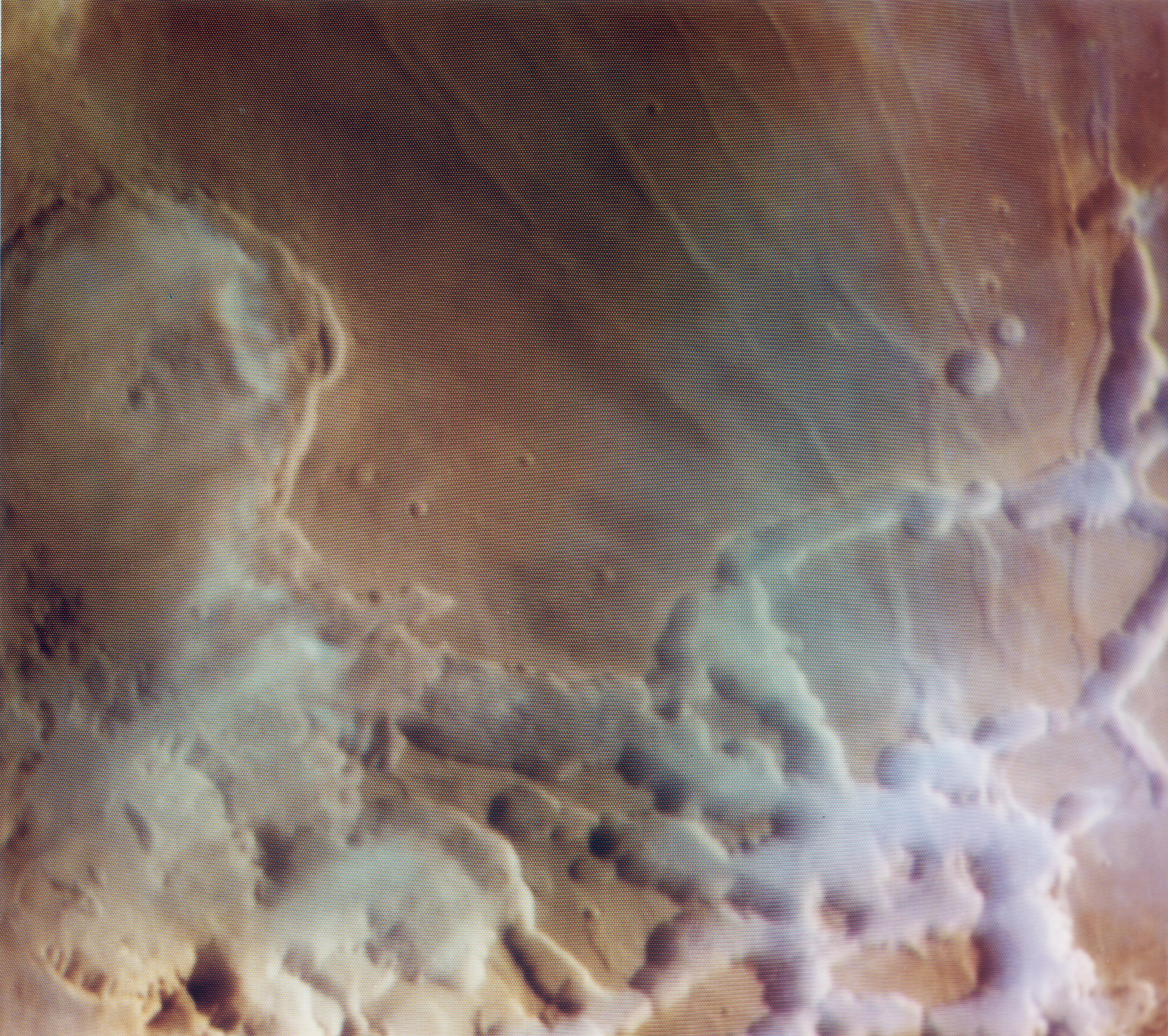
Morning water ice fog spills out of Noctis Labyrinthus (Viking 1 orbiter image).

Noctis Labyrinthus, on the western edge of the Valles Marineris Rift System, north of the Syria Planum and east of Pavonis Mons, is a jumbled terrain composed of huge blocks which are heavily fractured. It also contains canyons that run in different directions surrounding large blocks of older terrain. Most of the upper parts of the blocks are composed of younger fractured material thought to be of volcanic origin associated with the Tharsis bulge. The other tops are composed of older fractured material thought also to be volcanic in origin, but differentiated from the younger material by more ruggedness and more impact craters. The sides of the blocks are composed of undivided material thought to be basement rock. The space between the blocks is composed mainly of either rough or smooth floor material. The rough floor material tends to be in the eastern portion of the Noctis Labyrinthus and is thought to be debris from the walls or maybe eolian features covering rough topography and landslides. The smooth floor material is thought to be composed of fluvial or basaltic material and/or eolian features covering an otherwise rough and jumbled terrain. Terrains such as Noctis Labyrinthus are commonly found at the head of outflow channels, like the one explored by the Pathfinder mission and its Sojourner rover. They are interpreted to be a place of downward block faulting associated with the removal of ground fluid in catastrophic flood sequences. The fluid could be either carbon-dioxide ice and gas, water or lava. The hypothesis of lava involvement is associated with a proposal that Noctis Labyrinthus is directly connected to lava tubes on the slope of Pavonis Mons. In 2024, scientists found evidence that the hypothesized lava came from a volcano they dubbed Noctis Mons, which would be the seventh-highest mountain on Mars at 9,028 m (29,619 ft), and that the eastern part of its base was home to multiple glaciers with potential for hosting life, which could make it a highly valuable candidate target for astrobiology missions.

=== Ius and Tithonium chasmata ===
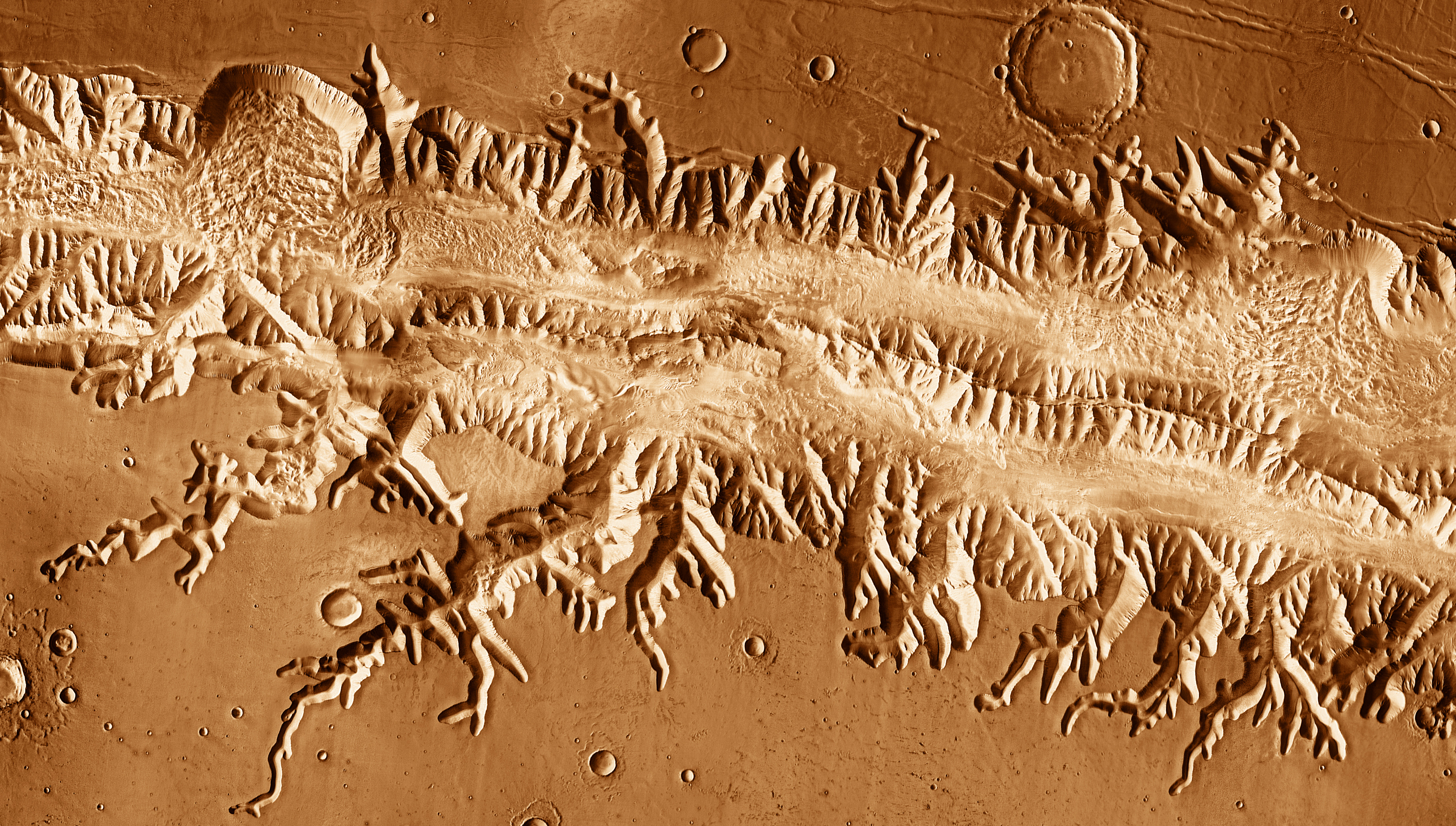
Ius Chasma image mosaic from 2001 Mars Odyssey, showing side canyons created by sapping. On the northern (upper) rim, right of center, a canyon turns 90 degrees where it encounters a graben.

Further to the east from Oudemans, Ius and Tithonium chasmata are located parallel to each other, Ius to the south and Tithonium to the north. Ius is the wider of the two, leading to Melas Chasma. Ius has a ridge down the center of it by the name of Geryon Montes, composed of the undivided basement rock. The floor of Ius Chasma is mostly composed of pristine landslide material, not much degraded by cratering or erosion. The southern wall of Ius, and to a lesser extent the northern wall, has many short valleys stretching off roughly perpendicular to the line of the chasmas. These valleys have a stubby theater-headed leading edge very much like features seen on the Colorado Plateau near the Grand Canyon that appear from groundwater sapping. (Theater-headed means that, from above, the head of the valley is a well-defined U-shape). The valley is propagated by the continued erosion and the collapse of the wall. Tithonium Chasma is very similar to Ius, except it is lacking the sapping features on the south side and contains a small portion of material that is similar to the smooth floor features except that it appears to be an ash fall that has been eroded by the wind. Between the two canyons, the surface is composed of younger fractured material - lava flows and faults from crustal extension of the Tharsis Bulge.

=== Melas, Candor and Ophir chasmata ===
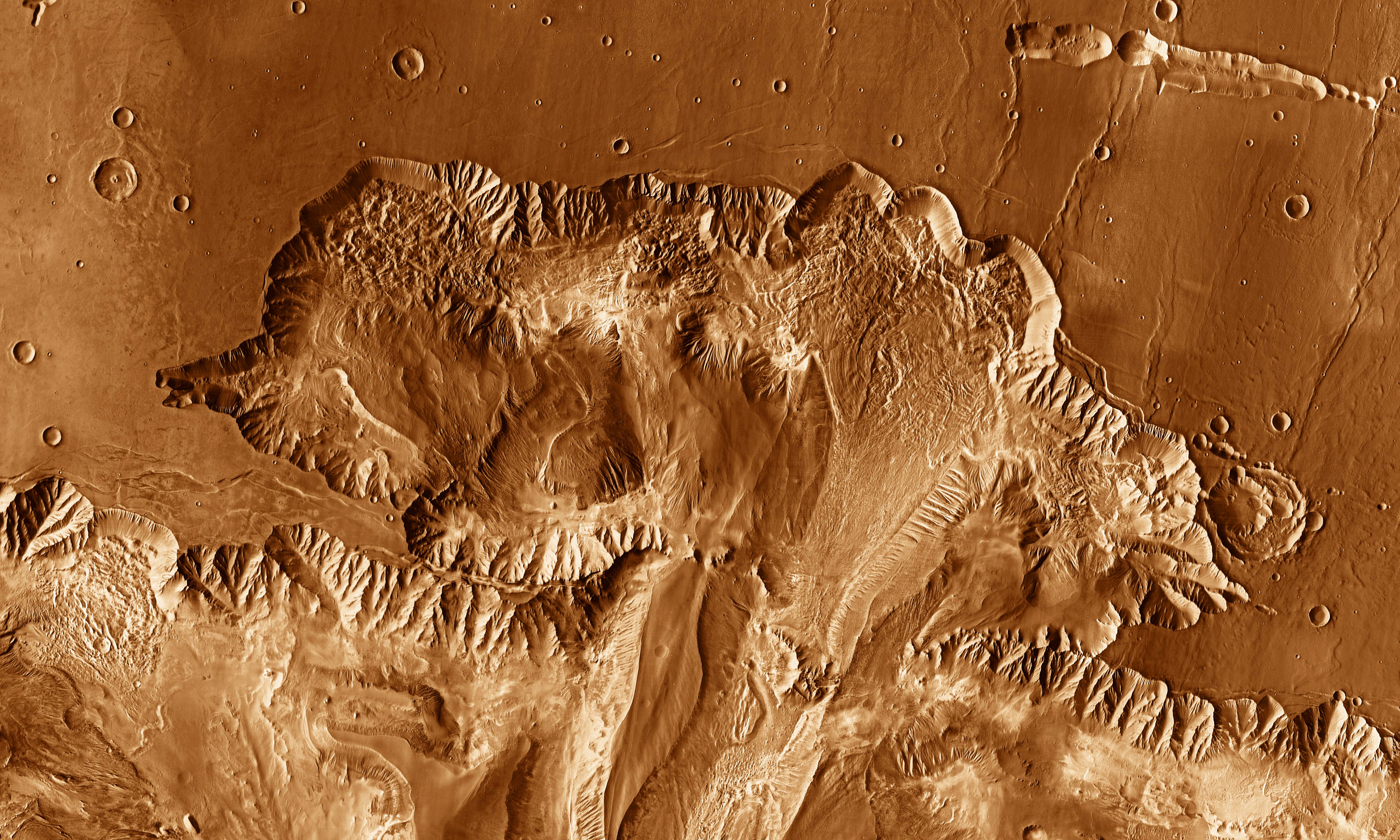
Ophir Chasma THEMIS mosaic

The next portion of Valles Marineris to the east are three chasmata, that from south to north are Melas, Candor and Ophir chasmata. Melas is east of Ius, Candor is east of Tithonium and Ophir appears as an oval that runs into Candor. All three chasmata are connected. The floor of Melas Chasma is about 70% younger massive material that is thought to be volcanic ash whipped up by the wind into eolian features. It also contains rough floor material from the erosion of the canyon walls. Also, in these central chasmata there is a portion of the floor that is higher than the rest of the floor, most likely left by the continued dropping of the other floor material. Around the edges of Melas is also a lot of slide material as seen in Ius and Tithonium chasmata.

The material of the floor of the canyon system between Candor and Melas chasmata is grooved. This is interpreted to be alluvial deposits and/or material that has collapsed or contracted by the removal of ice or water. There are also portions of older and younger massive floor material of volcaniclastic origin - only separated in age by crater distribution. Also there is etched massive floor material that is like the younger and older massive material except that it has wind erosion features on it. There are also a few spires of undivided material composed of the same material as the canyon walls.

=== Coprates Chasma ===
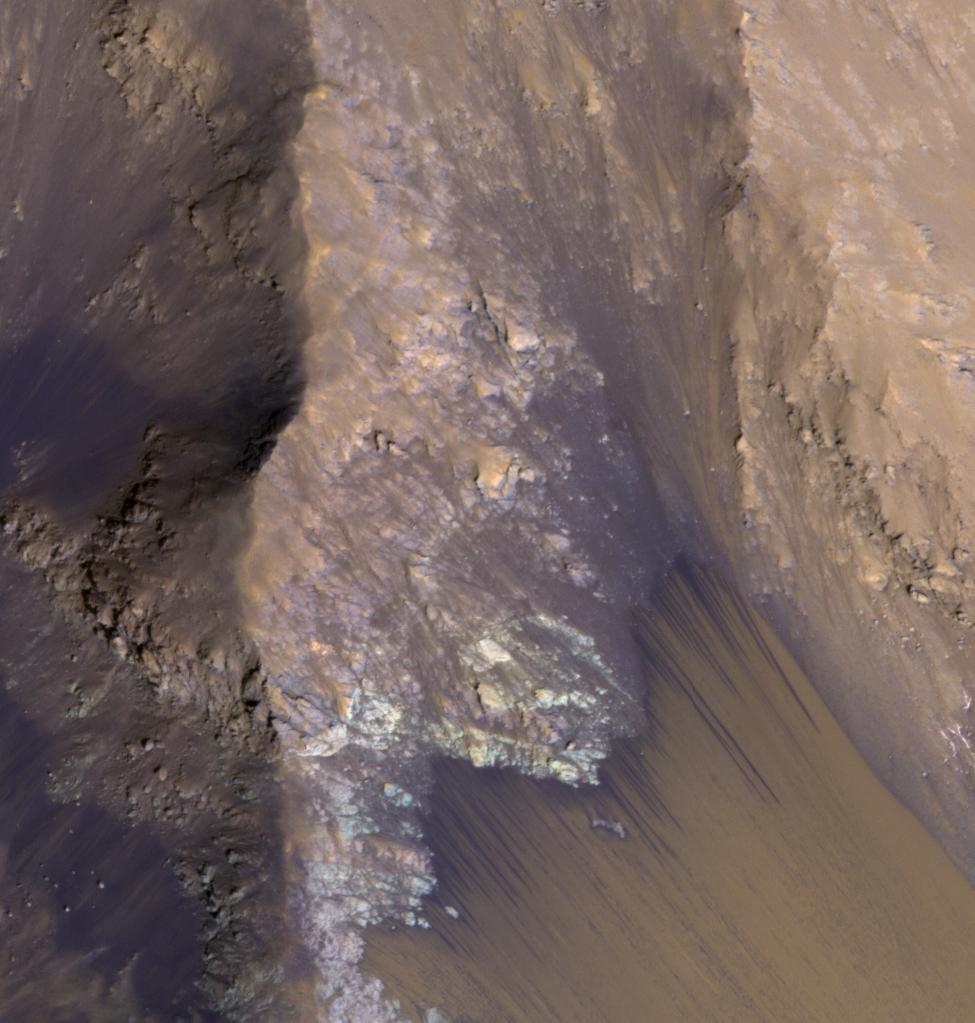
Seasonal flows on Coprates Chasma in Valles Marineris

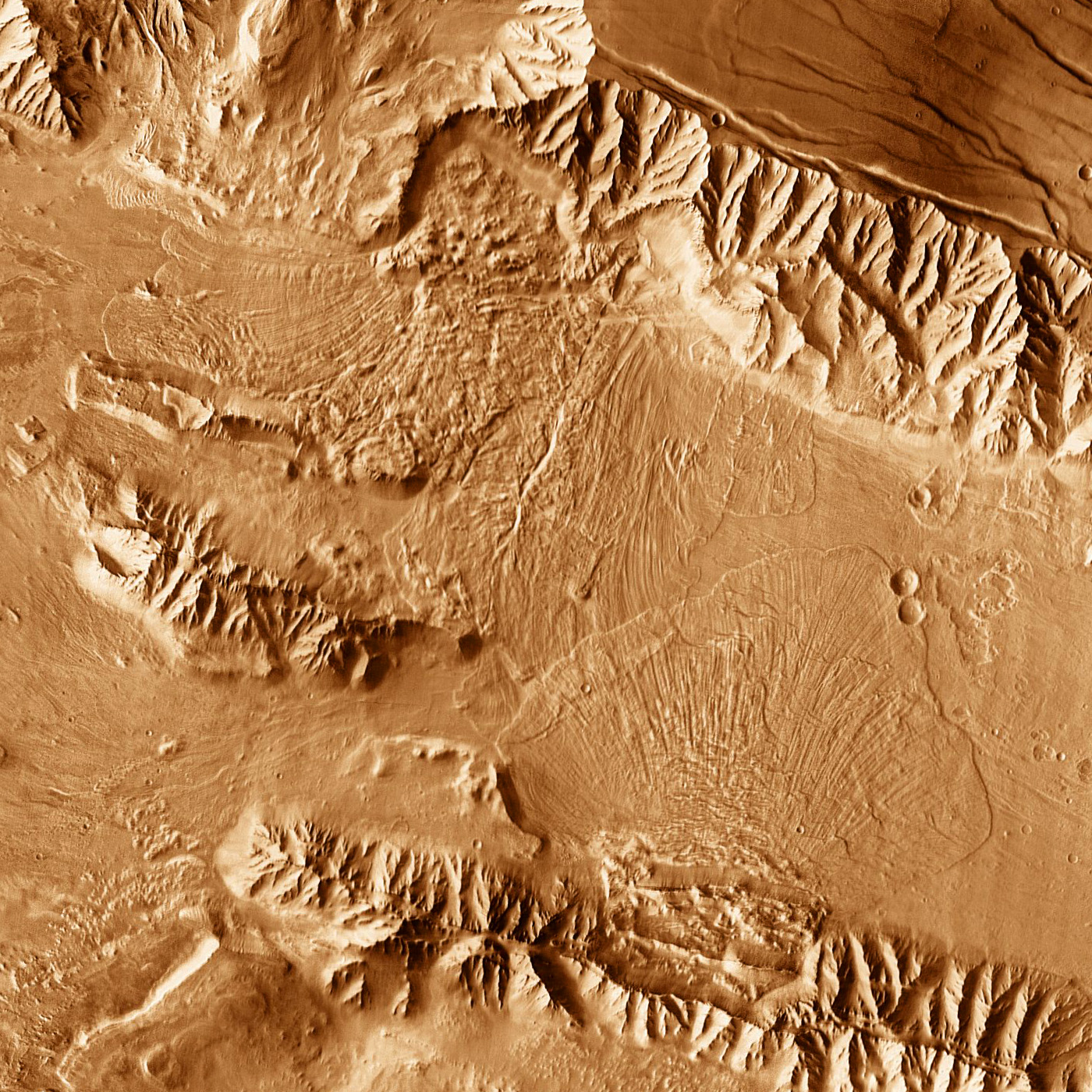
Deposits from landslides moving in opposite directions meet on the canyon floor near the junction of Melas and Coprates chasmata.

Further to the east, the canyon system runs into Coprates Chasma, which is very similar to Ius and Tithonium chasmata. Coprates differs from Ius in the eastern end which contains alluvial deposits and eolian material and like Ius, has layered deposits, although the deposits in the Coprates Chasma are much more well defined. These deposits pre-date the Valles Marineris system, suggesting erosion and sedimentary processes later cut by the Valles Marineris system. Newer data from Mars Global Surveyor suggest that the origin of this layering is either just a succession of landslides, one over another, volcanic in origin, or it may be the bottom of a basin of either liquid or solid water ice suggesting that the peripheral canyons of the Valles Marineris system could have been at one time isolated lakes formed from erosional collapse. Another possible source of the layered deposits could be wind-blown, but the diversity of the layers suggests that this material is not dominant. Note that only the upper layers are thin, while the bottom layers are very big, suggesting that the lower layers were composed of mass wasted rock and the upper layers come from another source. Some of this layering may have been transferred to the floor by landslides in which the layers are kept semi-intact, yet the layered section looks highly deformed with thickening and thinning beds that have multitudes of folds in them as seen in MOC image #8405. This complex terrain could also be just eroded sediment from an ancient Martian lake-bed and appear complex because all that we have is an aerial view like a geologic map and not enough elevation data to see if the beds are horizontal.

Near 60° W is the deepest point of the Valles Marineris system (as well as its lowest point by elevation) at 11 km (36,000 ft) below the surrounding plateau. Eastward from here there is about a 0.03 degree slope upward before reaching the outflow channels, which means that if you poured fluid into this part of the canyon, it would form a lake with a depth of 1 km (3,300 ft) before spilling over towards the northern plains.

A field of more than 100 pitted cones on the floor of Coprates Chasma has been interpreted as a set of small igneous cinder or tuff cones, with associated lava flows. Crater dating indicates they are of Middle to Late Amazonian age, about 200 to 400 million years old.

=== Eos and Ganges chasmata ===
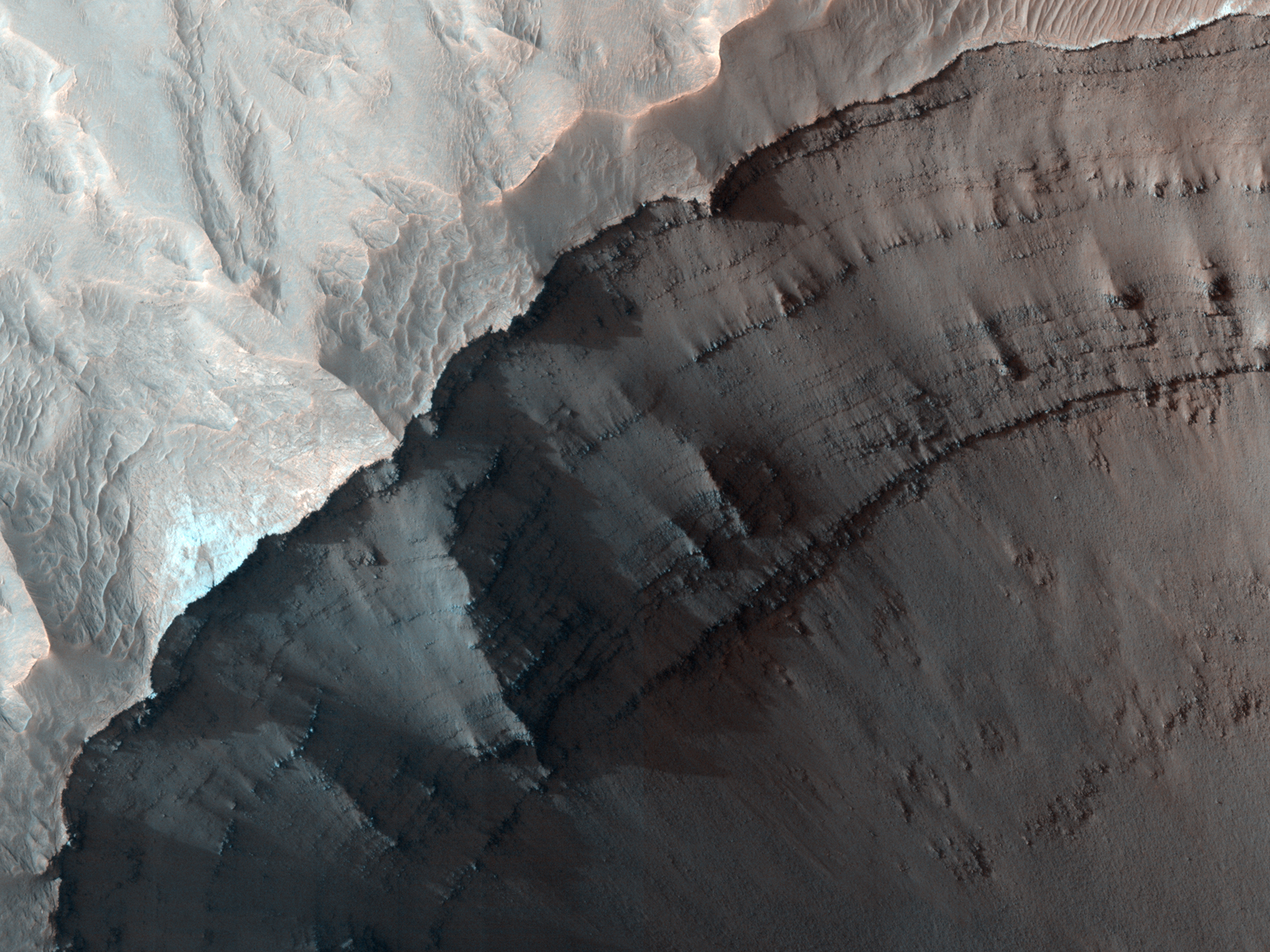
Rim of Ganges chasma, closeup showing stratigraphy and small landslides

Further to the east lie Eos and Ganges chasmata. Eos Chasma's western floor is mainly composed of an etched massive material composed of either volcanic or eolian deposits later eroded by the Martian wind. The eastern end of the Eos chasma has a large area of streamlined bars and longitudinal striations. This is interpreted to be stream-carved plateau deposits and material transported and deposited by flowing fluid. Ganges Chasma is an offshoot chasma of Eos in a general east–west trend. The floor of Ganges is mainly composed of alluvial deposits from the canyon walls.

=== Chryse region ===
East of Eos and Ganges, Valles Marineris empties out into the Chryse region of the northern plains of Mars at an elevation only 1 km (3,300 ft) above the deepest point of Valles Marineris in Melas Chasma. The outflow regions of the northern plains are similar to the terrain seen at the Mars Pathfinder landing site. A terrestrial counterpart of these outflow channels on Earth would be the scablands of eastern Washington. The eastern Washington scablands are a result of repeated catastrophic flooding due to the build-up of an ice dam at the head of Lake Missoula in the Late Pleistocene. The ice dam would block the water for a while, but when it broke, the ice would float on top of the ensuing flood and vast areas would be stripped of topsoil and vegetation, leaving a large barren area of 'teardrop' islands, longitudinal grooves and terraced margins. Many of these features are also seen in Martian outflow channels, but on a larger scale.

The outflow occurs successively through several regions of chaotic terrain, Aurorae Chaos and Hydraotes Chaos, and finally through Simud Valles and Tiu Valles into Chryse Planitia.

== See also ==
- Geography of Mars
- Lakes on Mars
- Vallis
- Mars carbonate catastrophe
