= Gorgonum Chaos =

Chaos on Mars

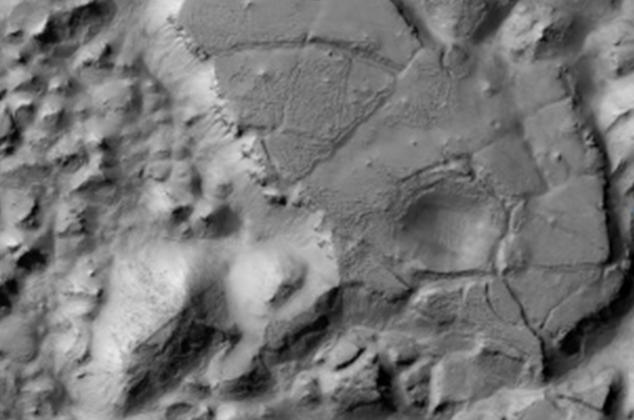
- Gorgonum Chaos as seen by Mars Reconnaissance Orbiter HiRISE. Image is about 4 km (2.5 mi) wide.
- Coordinates: 37.5°S 170.9°W

Gorgonum Chaos is a set of canyons in the Phaethontis quadrangle of Mars. It is located at 37.5° south latitude and 170.9° west longitude. Its name comes from an albedo feature at 24S, 154W. Some of the first gullies on Mars were found in Gorgonum Chaos. It is generally believed that it once contained a lake. Other nearby features are Sirenum Fossae, Maadim Vallis, Ariadnes Colles, and Atlantis Chaos. Some of the surfaces in the region are formed from the Electris deposits.

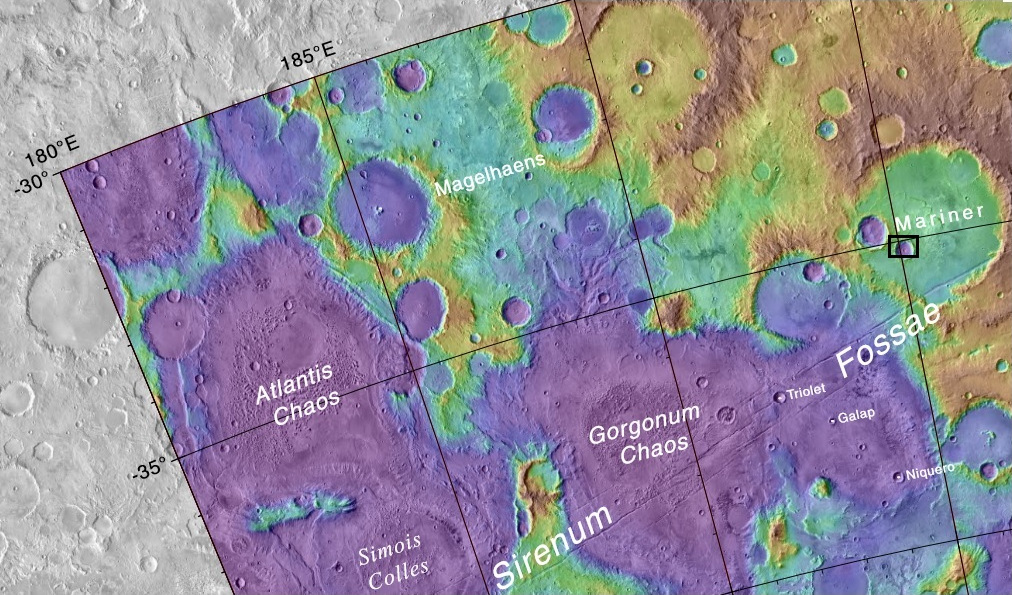
Map showing relative positions of Gorgonum Chaos, Atlantis Chaos, Magelhaens Crater and Simois Colles

== Gullies ==
Gullies on Mars may be due to recent flowing water. Many are present in the Gorgonum Chaos. Gullies occur on steep slopes, especially craters. Gullies are believed to be relatively young because they have few, if any craters, and they lie on top of sand dunes which are young. Usually, each gully has an alcove, channel, and apron. Although many ideas have been put forward to explain them, the most popular involve liquid water either coming from an aquifer or left over from old glaciers.

There is evidence for both theories. Most of the gully alcove heads occur at the same level, just as one would expect of an aquifer. Various measurements and calculations show that liquid water could exist in an aquifer at the usual depths where the gullies begin. One variation of this model is that rising hot magma could have melted ice in the ground and caused water to flow in aquifers. Aquifers are layer that allow water to flow. They may consist of porus sandstone. This layer would be perched on top of another layer that prevents water from going down (in geological terms it would be called impermeable). The only direction the trapped water can flow is horizontally. The water could then flow out onto the surface when it reaches a break, like a crater wall. Aquifers are quite common on Earth. A good example is "Weeping Rock" in Zion National Park Utah.

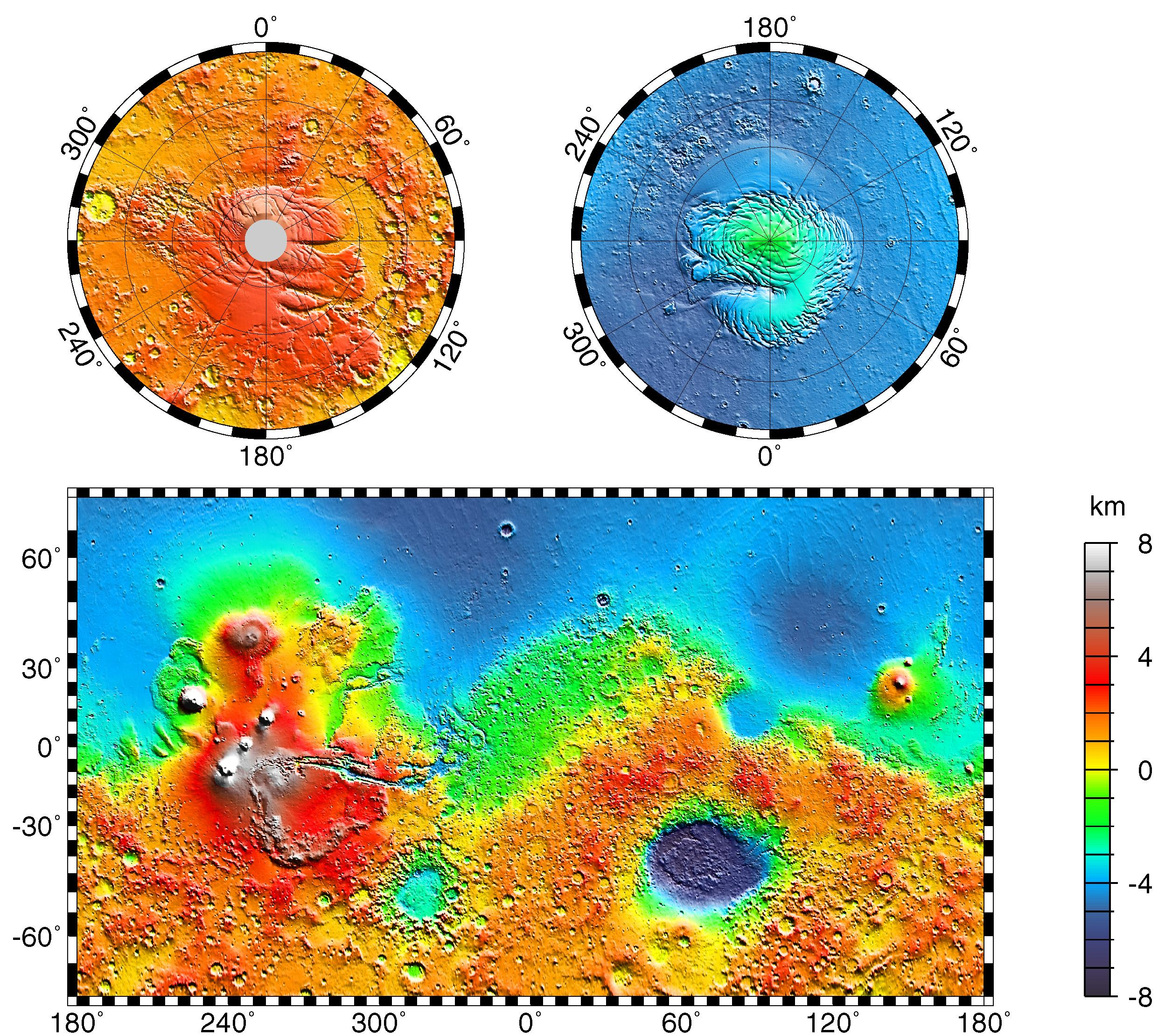
Topographic map – volcanic peaks in white due to great height. Near the equator, three volcanoes point south to Phaethontis quadrangle and three large craters – an area containing many gullies.

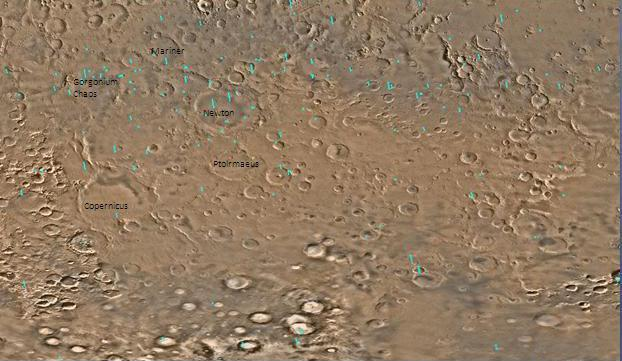
Map of Phaethontis quadrangle. Click to enlarge and see crater names.

On the other hand, much of the surface of Mars is covered by a thick smooth mantle that is thought to be a mixture of ice and dust. This ice-rich mantle, a few yards thick, smooths the land, but in places it has a bumpy texture, resembling the surface of a basketball. Under certain conditions the ice could melt and flow down the slopes to create gullies. Because there are few craters on this mantle, the mantle is relatively young. An excellent view of this mantle is shown below in the picture of the Ptolemaeus Crater Rim, as seen by HiRISE.

Changes in Mars's orbit and tilt cause significant changes in the distribution of water ice from polar regions down to latitudes equivalent to Texas. During certain climate periods water vapor leaves polar ice and enters the atmosphere. The water comes back to ground at lower latitudes as deposits of frost or snow mixed generously with dust. The atmosphere of Mars contains a great deal of fine dust particles. Water vapor will condense on the particles, then fall down to the ground due to the additional weight of the water coating. When ice at the top of the mantling layer goes back into the atmosphere, it leaves behind dust, which insulates the remaining ice.

== See also ==
- Chaos terrain
- Electris deposits
- Fossa (geology)
- HiRISE
- Lakes on Mars
- List of areas of chaos terrain on Mars
- Martian chaos terrain
- Martian Gullies
- Outflow channels
- Phaethontis quadrangle
