= The 50 Most Extreme Places in Our Solar System =

Book by R. David Baker and James Todd Ratcliff

- Hardcover of The 50 Most Extreme Places in Our Solar System
- Author: David Baker and Todd Ratcliff
- Language: English
- Subject: Astronomy, Planetary Science, Solar System, Space
- Publisher: Belknap Press of Harvard University Press
- Publication date: September 1, 2010
- Publication place: United States
- Pages: 302
- ISBN: 978-0-674-04998-7

The 50 Most Extreme Places in Our Solar System is a science book by David Baker, professor of physics at Austin College and Todd Ratcliff, a planetary geophysicist at the Jet Propulsion Laboratory. The book explores the most extreme environments found across the Solar System, from the tallest peaks and deepest valleys to the hottest and coldest places. It was published to provide insights into the diverse conditions present within the Solar System and to highlight the extremes that can exist on other planets and moons.

== Content Detail ==
The book is divided into several chapters, each detailing a specific "extreme" location within the Solar System. These locations are selected based on their unique physical characteristics and their scientific interest. The authors utilize data and images from various space missions and telescopes to illustrate the conditions of these extreme sites. Each chapter explains the formation, discovery, and importance of these locations in the broader context of planetary science and astronomy.

- Valles Marineris on Mars: The largest canyon in the Solar System, Valles Marineris stretches over 4,000 km long and reaches depths of up to 7 km. The authors explore its geological formation and discuss its comparison to Earth’s Grand Canyon.
- Io’s Volcanoes: Jupiter's moon Io is the most volcanically active body in the Solar System. The book delves into how tidal forces from Jupiter cause this volcanic activity and what it might tell us about geological processes elsewhere.
- The Surface of Venus: Known for its extreme temperatures and atmospheric pressure, Venus is often described as Earth's "evil twin." The authors explain the greenhouse effect gone to extremes and its implications for planetary habitability

== Authors ==
=== David Baker ===
David Baker is a professor of physics at Austin College, with a focus on planetary science. His research interests include the study of planetary atmospheres and geophysical phenomena across the solar system. Baker has contributed to numerous publications in the field of astronomy and is known for his ability to translate complex scientific concepts into accessible information for students and the general public.

=== Todd Ratcliff ===
Todd Ratcliff is a planetary geophysicist who has worked extensively on analyzing data from space missions. His expertise includes the study of planetary geology and the internal structures of moons and planets. Ratcliff's work has helped in understanding the seismic and geological activities of celestial bodies within our solar system.

== Translations ==
The book is currently available in two translations with a third in progress.

- German Extreme Orte
- Korean Extreme Space
- Japanese

== Awards and reviews ==
Reviews have been positive including being awarded Honorable Mention in Cosmology and Astronomy in the 2010 PROSE Awards and named an Outstanding University Press Book for Public and Secondary School Libraries by the Association of American University Presses.
