= Tinjar Valles =

Valles of Mars

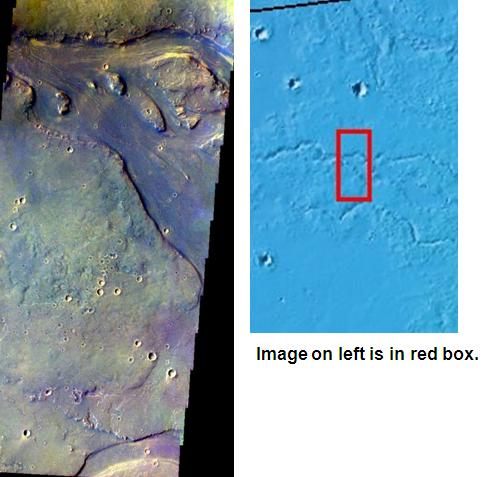
- The Tinjar Valles, as seen by THEMIS. The color is enhanced to show differences.
- Coordinates: 38°N 235.8°W
- Naming: A modern river in Sarawak, Malaysia

The Tinjar Valles are an ancient set of outflow channels in the Amenthes quadrangle of Mars, located at 38° north latitude and 235.8° west longitude. They are 425 km long and were named after a modern river in Sarawak, Malaysia. They have been identified as outflow channels.
