= Hebrus =

Hebrus may refer to:

- the Latin name of the Maritsa river in Bulgaria and Greece
  - Hebrus, the nameshake of the river in Greek mythology
- the Latin name of the Devoll river in present-day Albania
- Hebrus (bug), a genus of water bugs
- the Hebrus Valles, an outflow channel system on Mars
