= Sirenum Fossae =

Fossae on Mars

- Part of Sirenum Fossae based on THEMIS day-time image
- Coordinates: 34.9°S 160.9°W

Sirenum Fossae is a long trough in several quadrangles including Memnonia quadrangle and Phaethontis quadrangle of Mars, centered at 35.57° south latitude and 197.26° west longitude. Sirenum Fossae is 2,735 km long and was named after a classical albedo feature name. Troughs on Mars like this one are called Fossae. Sirenum Fossae is believed to have formed by movement along a pair of faults causing a center section to drop down. This kind of feature is called a graben.

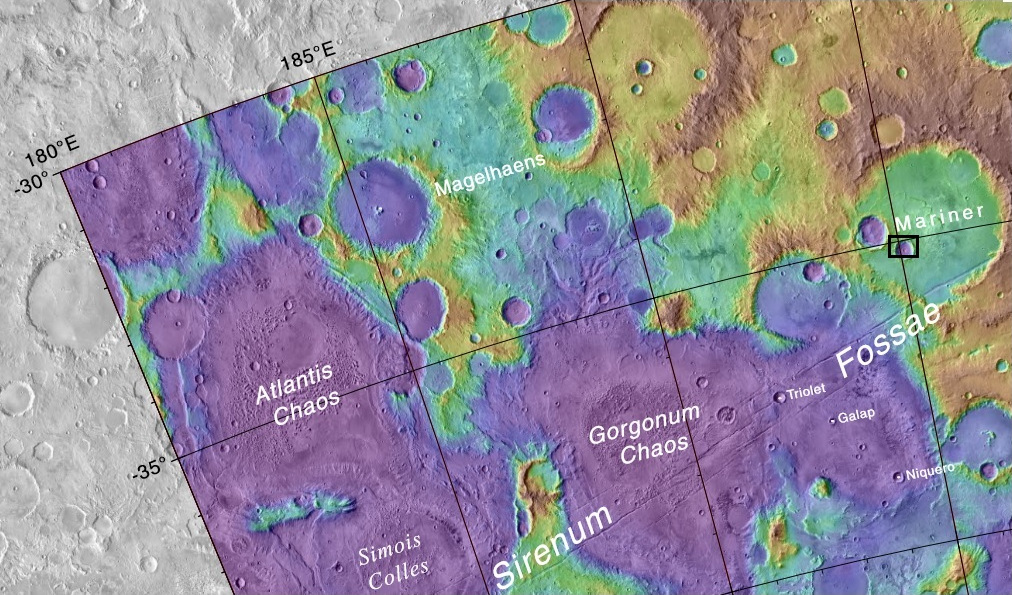
Map showing relative positions of Sirenum Fossae, Atlantis Chaos, Gorgonum Chaos, Magelhaens Crater and Simois Colles

== Gullies ==
The pictures below show gullies in Sirenum Fossae. Gullies occur on steep slopes, especially on the walls of craters. Gullies are believed to be relatively young because they have few, if any craters. Moreover, they lie on top of sand dunes which themselves are considered to be quite young. Usually, each gully has an alcove, channel, and apron. Some studies have found that gullies occur on slopes that face all directions, others have found that the greater number of gullies are found on poleward facing slopes, especially from 30-44 S.

For years, many believed that gullies were formed by running water, but further observations demonstrate that they may be formed by frozen carbon dioxide (dry ice). Recent studies describe using the High Resolution Imaging Science Experiment (HiRISE) camera on MRO to examine gullies at 356 sites, starting in 2006. Thirty-eight of the sites showed active gully formation. Before-and-after images demonstrated the timing of this activity coincided with seasonal carbon dioxide frost and temperatures that would not have allowed for liquid water. When dry ice frost changes to a gas, it may lubricate dry material to flow especially on steep slopes. In some years frost, perhaps as thick as 1 meter, triggers avalanches. This frost contains mostly dry ice, but also has tiny amounts of water ice.

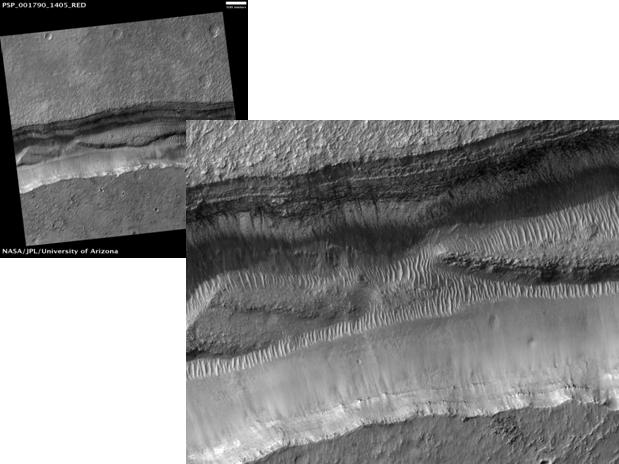
Sirenum Fossae layers, as seen by HiRISE. Scale bar is 500 meters long.

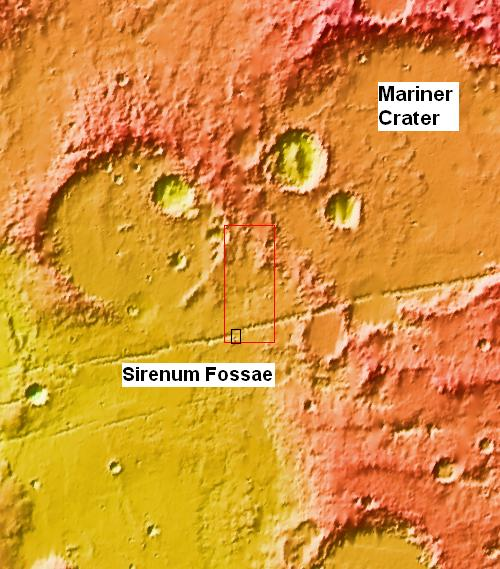
MOLA context image for the series of three images to follow of gullies in a trough and nearby crater. This image shows where the image is in relation to Mariner Crater and Sirenum Fossae.

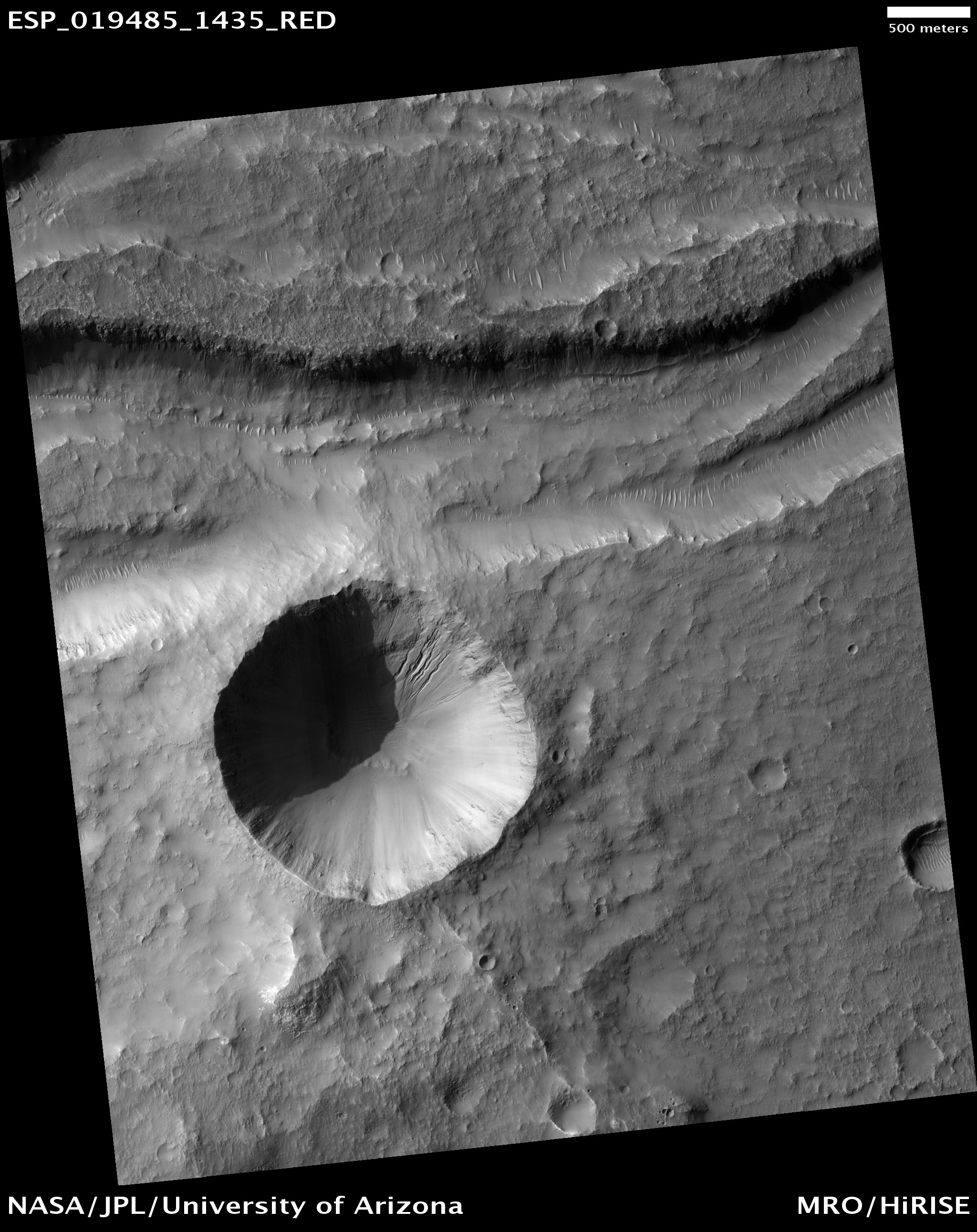
Gullies in a trough and nearby crater, as seen by HiRISE under the HiWish program. Scale bar is 500 meters long.

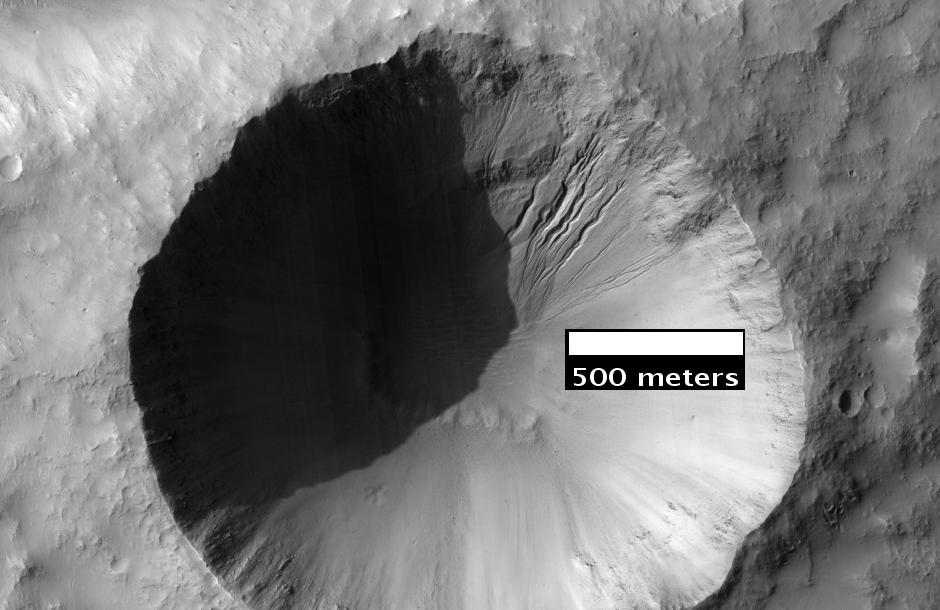
Close-up of gullies in crater, as seen by HiRISE under the HiWish program.

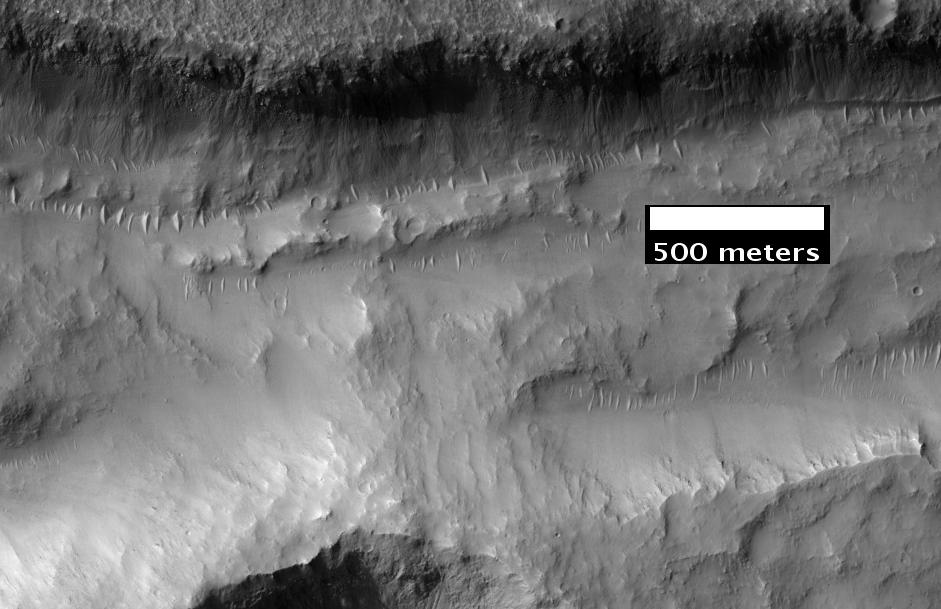
Close-up of gullies in trough, as seen by HiRISE under the HiWish program. These are some of the smaller gullies visible on Mars.

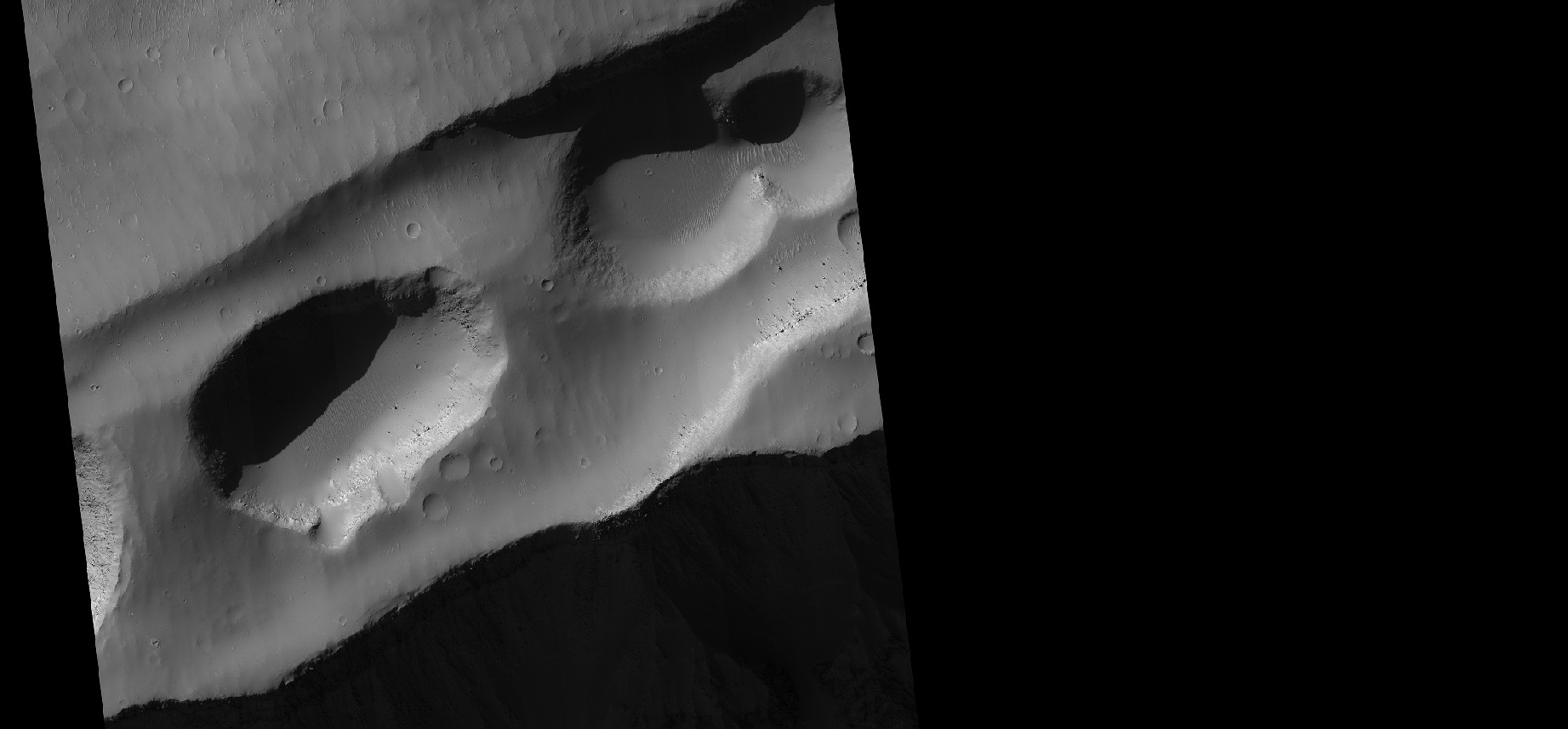
Large pits in Sirenum Fossae, as seen by HiRISE under HiWish program.

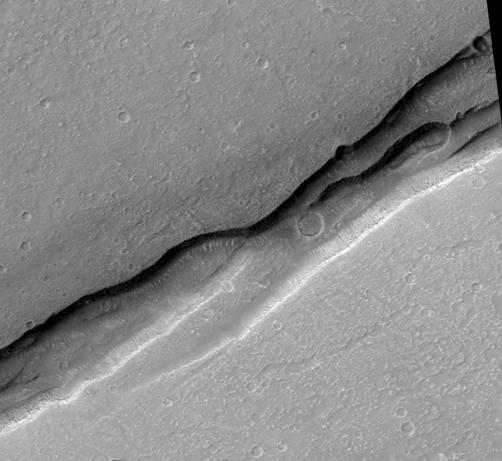
Sirenum Fossae, as seen by HiRISE.

== See also ==
- Fossa (geology)
- Geology of Mars
- HiRISE
- HiWish program
- Martian Gullies
- Mars Orbiter Laser Altimeter (MOLA)
