= Granicus Valles =

Valleys on Mars

- Granicus Valles tributary, as seen by HiRISE
- Coordinates: 30°N 229°W
- Naming: the ancient name for river in Turkey

The Granicus Valles are a network of valleys in the Amenthes quadrangle of Mars, located at 30° north latitude and 229° west longitude. They are 750 km long and are named after the ancient name for a river in Turkey. The system has been identified as outflow channels.
