= Outflow channels =

Long, wide swathes of scoured ground on Mars

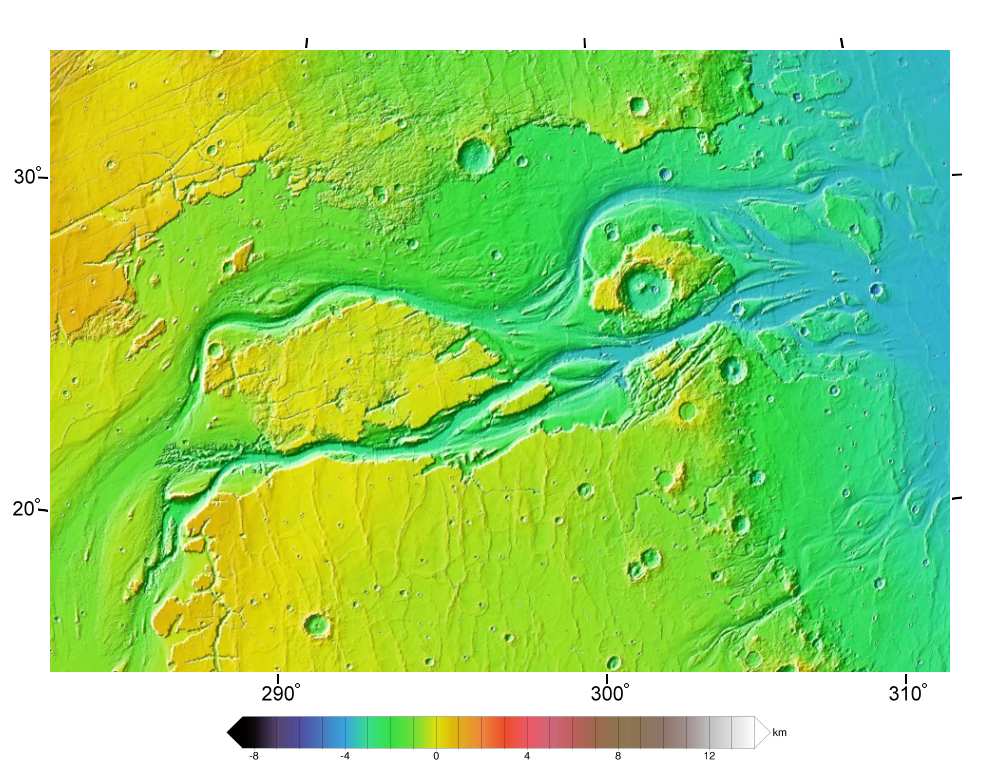
Kasei Valles, seen in MOLA elevation data. Flow was from bottom left to right. North is up. Image is approx. 1,600 km (990 mi) across. The channel system extends another 1,200 km (750 mi) south of this image to Echus Chasma.

Outflow channels are extremely long, wide swathes of scoured ground on Mars. They extend many hundreds of kilometers in length and are typically greater than one kilometer in width. They are thought to have been carved by huge outburst floods.

Crater counts indicate that most of the channels were cut since the early Hesperian, though the age of the features is variable between different regions of Mars. Some outflow channels in the Amazonis and Elysium Planitiae regions have yielded ages of only tens of millions of years, extremely young by the standards of Martian topographic features. The largest, Kasei Vallis, is around 3,500 km (2,200 mi) long, greater than 400 km (250 mi) wide and exceeds 2.5 km (1.6 mi) in depth cut into the surrounding plains.

The outflow channels contrast with the Martian channel features known as "valley networks", which much more closely resemble the dendritic planform more typical of terrestrial river drainage basins.

Outflow channels tend to be named after the names for Mars in various ancient world languages, or more rarely for major terrestrial rivers. The term outflow channels was introduced in planetology in 1975.

== Formation ==
On the basis of their geomorphology, locations and sources, the channels are today generally thought to have been carved by outburst floods (huge, rare, episodic floods of liquid water), although some authors have made the case for formation by the action of glaciers, lava, or debris flows. Calculations indicate that the volumes of water required to cut such channels at least equal and most likely exceed by several orders of magnitude the present discharges of the largest terrestrial rivers, and are probably comparable to the largest floods known to have ever occurred on Earth (e.g., those that cut the Channeled Scablands in North America or those released during the re-flooding of the Mediterranean basin at the end of the Messinian Salinity Crisis). Such exceptional flow rates and the implied associated volumes of water released could not be sourced by precipitation but rather demand the release of water from some long-term store, probably a subsurface aquifer sealed by ice and subsequently breached by meteorite impact or igneous activity.

== List of outflow channels by region ==
This is a partial list of named channel structures on Mars claimed as outflow channels in the literature, largely following The Surface of Mars by Carr. The channels tend to cluster in certain regions on the Martian surface, often associated with volcanic provinces, and the list reflects this. Originating structures at the head of the channels, if clear and named, are noted in parentheses and in italics after each entry.

=== Circum-Chryse region ===
Chryse Planitia is a roughly circular volcanic plain east of the Tharsis bulge and its associated volcanic systems. This region contains the most prominent and numerous outflow channels on Mars. The channels flow east or north into the plain.

- Ares Vallis (Aram Chaos; Iani Chaos)
- Kasei Vallis (Echus Chasma)
- Maja Valles (Juventae Chasma)
- Mawrth Vallis (no obvious source)
- Ravi Vallis (Aromatum Chaos)
- Shalbatana Vallis (chaos in Orson Welles crater; Ganges Chasma?)
- Simud Valles (Hydraotes Chaos; Aureum Chaos?; Arsinoes Chaos?)
- Tiu Valles (Aram Chaos?; Aureum Chaos?)

=== Tharsis region ===
In this region it is particularly difficult to distinguish outflow channels from lava channels but the following features have been suggested as at least overprinted by outflow channel floods:

- Parts of the Olympica Fossae
- Valleys adjacent to the southeast margin of Olympus Mons (nameless graben)

=== Amazonis and Elysium Planitiae ===
Several channels flow either onto the plains of Amazonis and Elysium from the southern highlands, or originate at graben within the plains. This region contains some of the youngest channels.

- Al-Qahira Vallis
- Athabasca Vallis (Cerberus Fossae)
- Grjota Vallis (nameless graben)
- Ma'adim Vallis (shallow depression in Highlands)
- Mangala Valles (Mangala Fossa)
- Marte Vallis (Cerberus Planitia)

=== Utopia Planitia ===
Several outflow channels rise in the region west of the Elysium volcanic province and flow northwestward to the Utopia Planitia. As common in the Amazonis and Elysium Planitiae regions, these channels tend to originate in graben. Some of these channels may be influenced by lahars, as indicated by their surface textures and ridged, lobate deposits at their margins and termini. The valleys of Hephaestus Fossae and Hebrus Valles are of extremely unusual form, and although sometimes claimed as outflow channels, are of enigmatic origin.

- Granicus Vallis (graben radial to Elysium Mons)
- Hrad Valles (graben radial to Elysium Mons)
- Tinjar Vallis (graben radial to Elysium Mons)
- Hebrus Valles (irregular depression; ends in discontinuous linear hollows)
- Hephaestus Fossae (irregular depression; flows through angular segments; ends in discontinuous linear hollows)

=== Hellas region ===
Three valleys flow from east of its rim down onto the floor of the Hellas basin.

- Dao Vallis (box canyon near Hadriaca Patera)
- Harmakhis Vallis (close to end of Reull Vallis)
- Niger Vallis (indistinct depressions near Hadriaca Patera)

=== Argyre region ===
It has been argued that Uzboi, Ladon, Margaritifer and Ares Valles, although now separated by large craters, once comprised a single outflow channel flowing north into Chryse Planitia. The source of this outflow has been suggested as overflow from the Argyre crater, formerly filled to the brim as a lake by channels (Surius, Dzigai, and Palacopus Valles) draining down from the south pole. If real, the full length of this drainage system would be over 8000 km, the longest known drainage path in the Solar System. Under this suggestion, the extant form of the outflow channel Ares Vallis would thus be a remolding of a pre-existing structure.

=== Polar regions ===
The large troughs present in each pole, Chasma Boreale and Chasma Australe, have both been argued to have been formed by meltwater release from beneath polar ice, as in a terrestrial jökulhlaup. However, others have argued for an eolian origin, with them induced by katabatic winds blowing down from the poles.

== See also ==
- Chaos terrain – Distinctive area of broken or jumbled terrain
- List of areas of chaos terrain on Mars
- Martian chaos terrain – Irregular groups of large blocks of rock
- Outburst flood – High-magnitude, low-frequency catastrophic flood involving the sudden release of water
- Valley network (Mars)
