= Hebrus Valles =

Valles on Mars

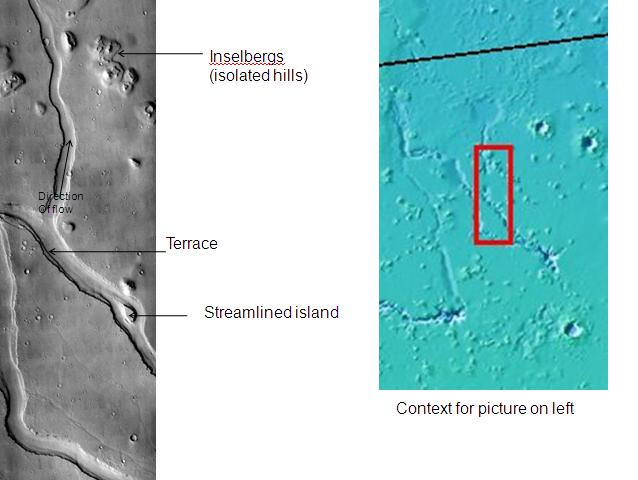
- The Hebrus Valles, as seen by THEMIS. Direction of flow was determined by shape of streamlined islands. Terraces may reflect the occurrence of multiple flood events.
- Location: Amenthes quadrangle, Mars
- Coordinates: 20.2°N 233.4°W

The Hebrus Valles are an ancient system of troughs and valleys in the Amenthes quadrangle of Mars, located at 20.2° north latitude and 233.4° west longitude. They are 317 km long and were named after a river in the Balkans which runs through present day Bulgaria, Greece and Turkey. Some authors have identified the troughs and valleys of Hebrus Valles as outflow channels, but their origin and history remain ambiguous. It has been considered as a potential site for human exploration due to the presence of icy caves.

== Geology ==
The Hebrus Valles have tributaries, terraces, and teardrop shaped islands. These features are all characteristic of erosion by fluid flow, but may or may not support the identification of this feature as carved by a single catastrophic outburst flood of water (as the term outflow channel would imply). The flood would have occurred during the early Amazonian. There is also an extensive cave network which is expected to contain water ice.

The Hebrus Valles region has been suggested to have Karst caves, which may be like the caverns of Earth. Such caves are formed by ancient water dissolving carbonate and sulfate rocks. Researchers have found eight possible cave openings, or "skylights.” This discovery of water-carved caves is a significant finding because life may exist there since it would be protected from the harsh surface environment. In addition, future colonists may be able to live in them. Karstic caves were formed when water flowed underground and dissolved carbonate and sulfate rocks, which created tunnels and chambers. When the roofs of these cavities collapsed, skylight entrances became visible from orbit.

The Thermal Emission Spectrometer (TES) discovered that the rock surrounding the cave entrances is rich in carbonates and sulfates, which easily dissolved by water. There is also much evidence that water flowed in the Hebrus Valles region, which contains tributaries, terraces, and teardrop-shaped islands that are formed by running water.

== Gallery ==
The Hebrus Valles, as seen from Themis. Since discontinuous pits and troughs are present, it is believed the troughs were created by collapse of surface material into voids.

== See also ==
- Amenthes quadrangle
- Geology of Mars
- Outflow channels
