= Tiu Valles =

Valles on Mars

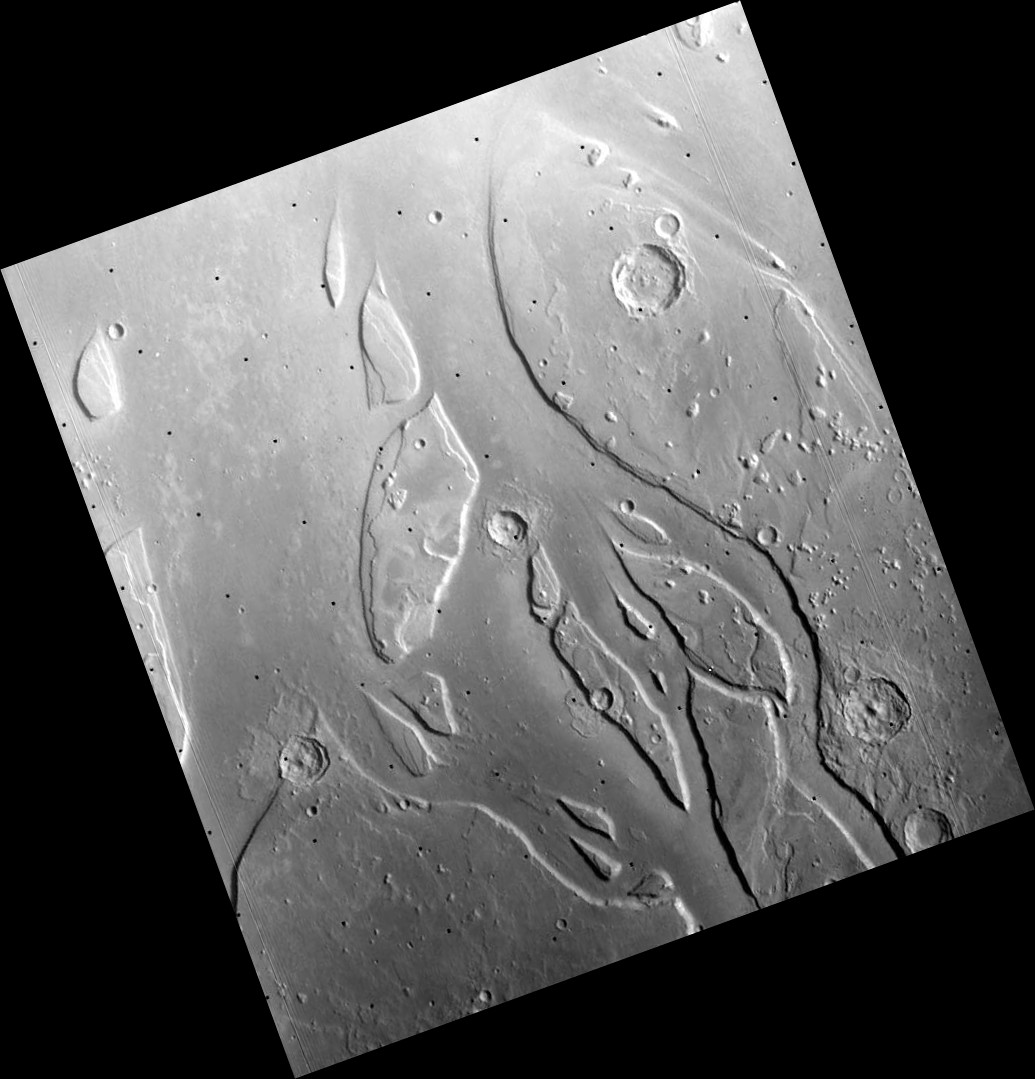
- Viking Orbiter 1 image of part of Tiu Valles
- Coordinates: 15.9°N 35.7°W

The Tiu Valles /ˈtiːuː ˈvæliːz/ are an outflow channel system in the Oxia Palus quadrangle of Mars, centered at 16.23° North and 34.86° West.

They are 1,720 km (1,070 mi) long and were named after the word for "Mars" in Old English (West Germanic).

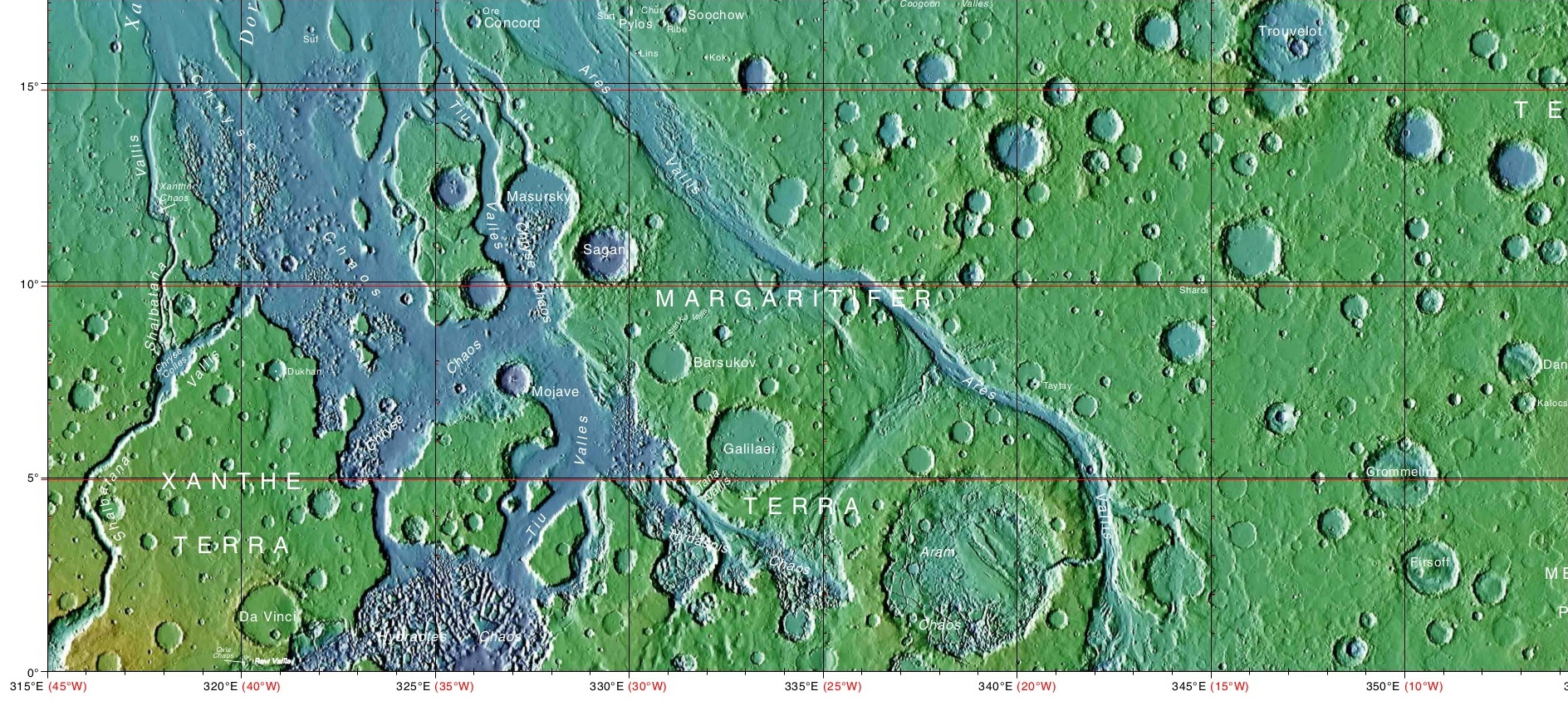
Topographic map of Oxia Palus region of Mars showing the location of a number of chaos regions and valleys, including the Tiu Valles

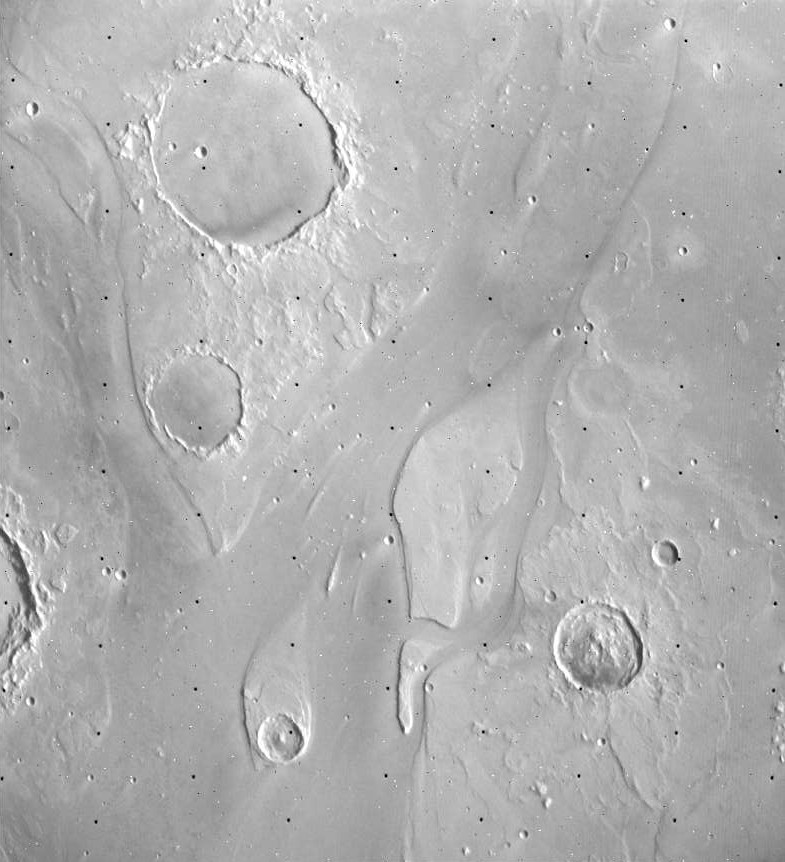
Viking Orbiter 1 image of a distal (northern) part of Tiu Valles, showing where it divides to go around the craters Lydda and Kipini.

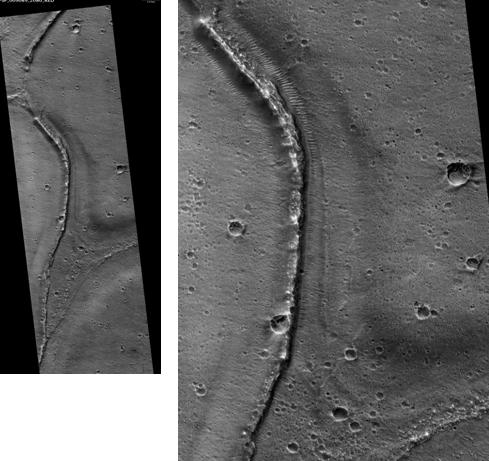
The Tiu Valles, as seen by HiRISE. Ridges were probably formed by running water (scale bar is 1.0 km)

== See also ==
- Chaos terrain
- Geology of Mars
- HiRISE
- Martian chaos terrain
- Outburst flood
- Outflow channels
