= Simois Colles =

Hilly region on Mars

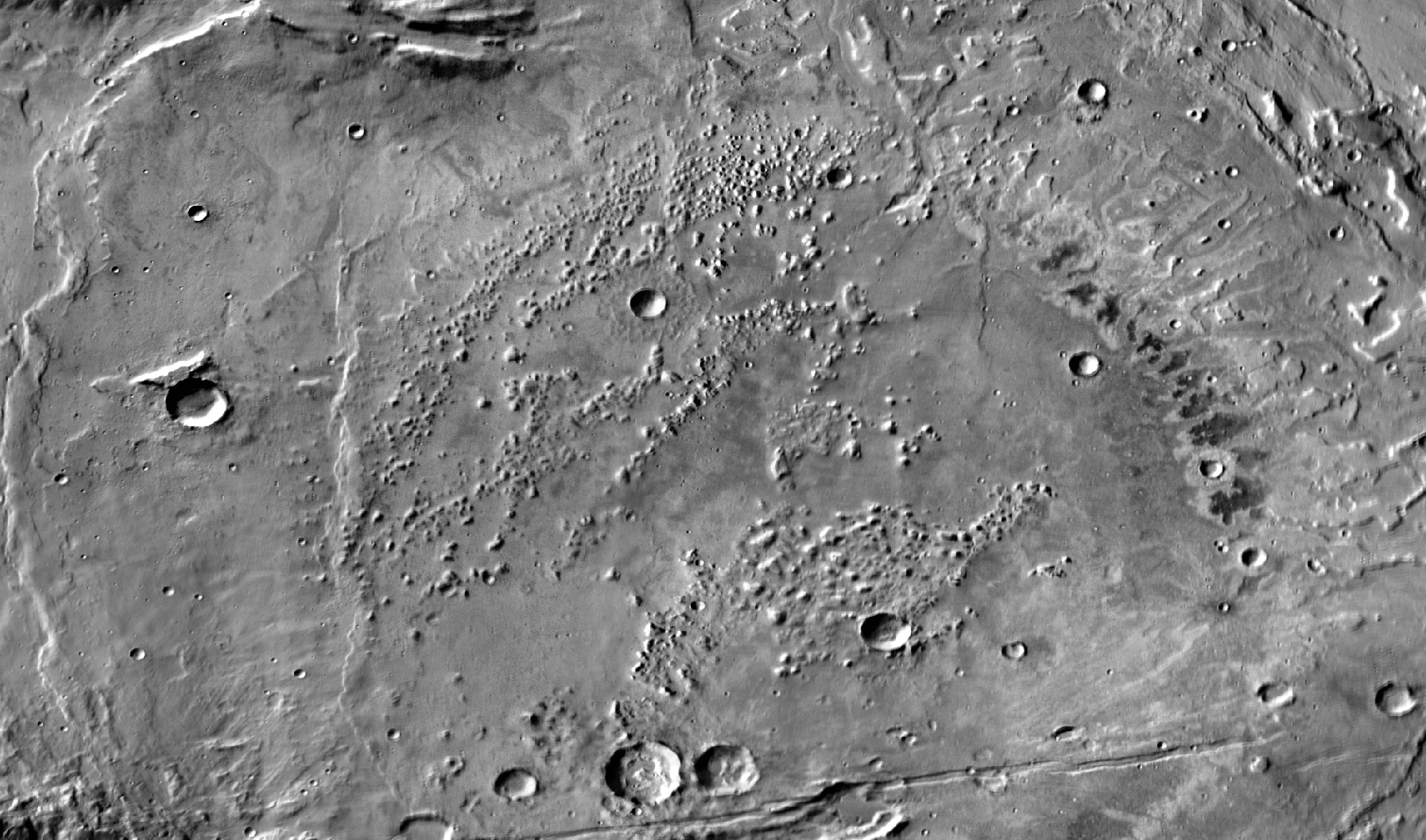
- Simois Colles, as seen by THEMIS.
- Location: Phaethontis quadrangle
- Coordinates: 37.72°S 176.59°W

Simois Colles is a region of colles (hills) in the northwest of Phaethontis quadrangle of Mars. It is located around 37.72° south latitude, and 176.59° west longitude. The region is 86.94 kilometers (54.02 mi) across, and was named after an albedo feature.

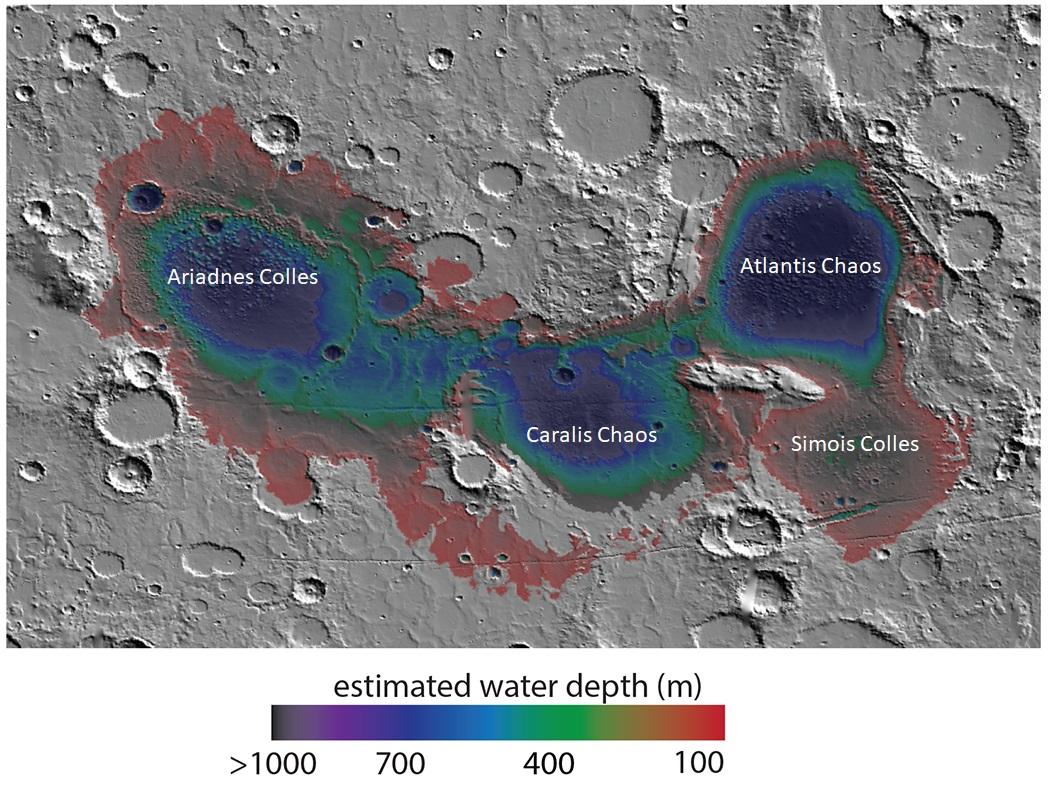
Map of Eridania Lake, including the area of Simois Colles
