= Simud Valles =

Valles on Mars

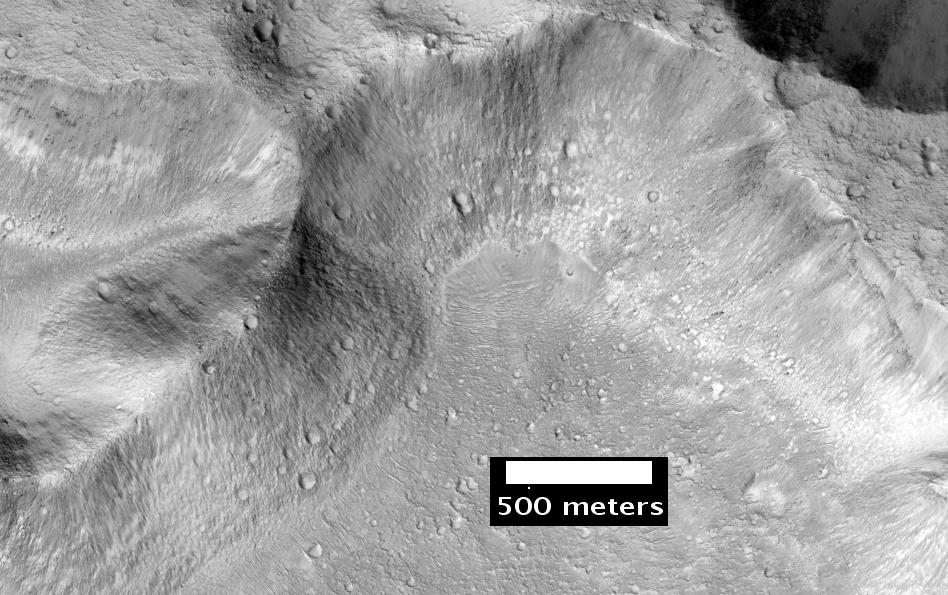
- Close-up of the Simud Valles, as seen by HiRISE.
- Coordinates: 19.8°N 37.8°W

The Simud Valles are an ancient outflow channel system in the Oxia Palus quadrangle of Mars, located at 19.8° N and 37.8° W. They are 945 km long and were named for the word for "Mars" in Sumerian. Note: Descriptor term changed to the plural (valles), and coordinates redefined 3/31/2008.

== See also ==
- Geology of Mars
- HiRISE
- Outflow channels
