= Juventae Chasma =

Box canyon on Mars

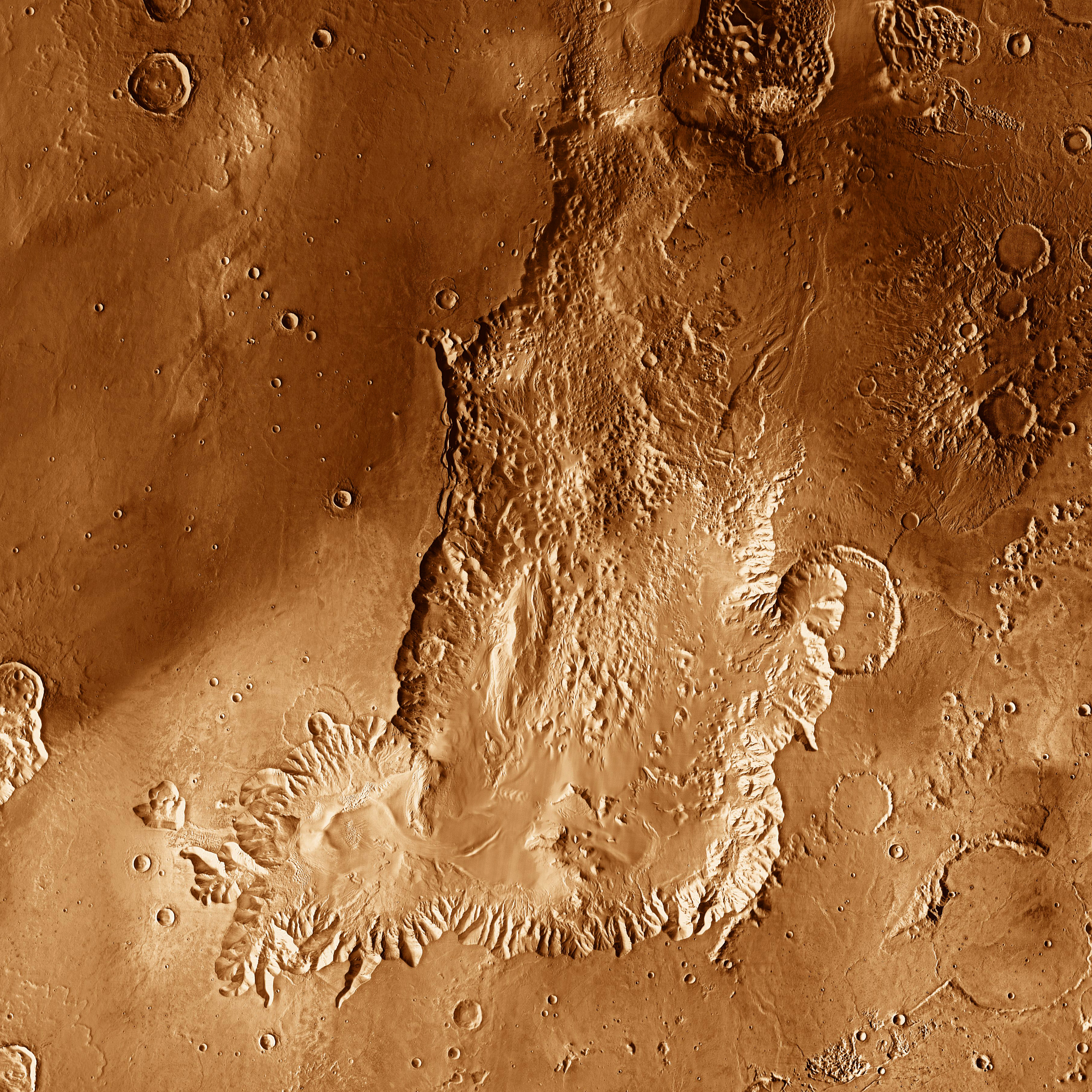
- Juventae Chasma in mosaic of THEMIS infrared images. Maja Valles extends north from the top of the image. Part of Baetis Chaos is visible at the top, with a smaller chaos region to its right.
- Coordinates: 3.5°S 61.4°W
- Length: 320.0

Juventae Chasma is an enormous box canyon (250 km × 100 km) on Mars which opens to the north and forms the outflow channel Maja Valles. Juventae Chasma is located north of Valles Marineris in the Coprates quadrangle and cuts more than 5 km into the plains of Lunae Planum.

== Name ==
Juventae was named by Giovanni Schiaparelli after the mythical Juventae Fons, the fountain of youth.

== Observations ==
The floor of Juventae Chasma is partly covered by sand dunes. There is also a 2.5 km high mountain inside Juventae, 59 km long and 23 km wide, that was confirmed by Mars Express to be composed of sulfate deposits. MRO discovered sulfates, hydrated sulfates, and iron oxides in Juventae Chasma. Juventae Chasma has four bright mounds or light-toned interior layered deposits (IlD's), as they are often called. Researchers have found that monohydrated sulfates were first deposited on the floor. And then polyhydrated sulfates were laid down. Kieserite, a magnesium sulfate, was also found in Juventae Chasma. Studies from satellites orbiting Mars have found channels on the eastern, western, and southern walls of Juventae Chasma. They seem to have different origins. Some may have started from melting snow, others from groundwater sapping, and still others from precipitation. Inverted channels are also present.

Inverted relief that are visible in Juventae Chasma are also visible in other parts of Mars. This occurs when sediments are deposited on the floor of a stream and then become resistant to erosion, perhaps by cementation. Later the area may be buried. Eventually, erosion removes the covering layer and the former streams become visible since they are resistant to erosion. Mars Global Surveyor found several examples of this process.

Ferric hydroxysulfate (Fe3+SO4OH) has been found in the plateau near Juventae Chasma. It was probably formed from the heating and oxidation of hydrated ferrous sulfates. The heat may have come from the deposition of lava or ash. Another possibility is that heat came from the ground by way of hydrothermal processes. This iron and sulfur compound was discovered with the Compact Reconnaissance Imaging Spectrometer for Mars (CRISM) instrument. Other spectra bands showed the presence of polyhydrated sulfates including rozenite (FeSO4•4H2O) and epsomite (MgSO4•7H2O).

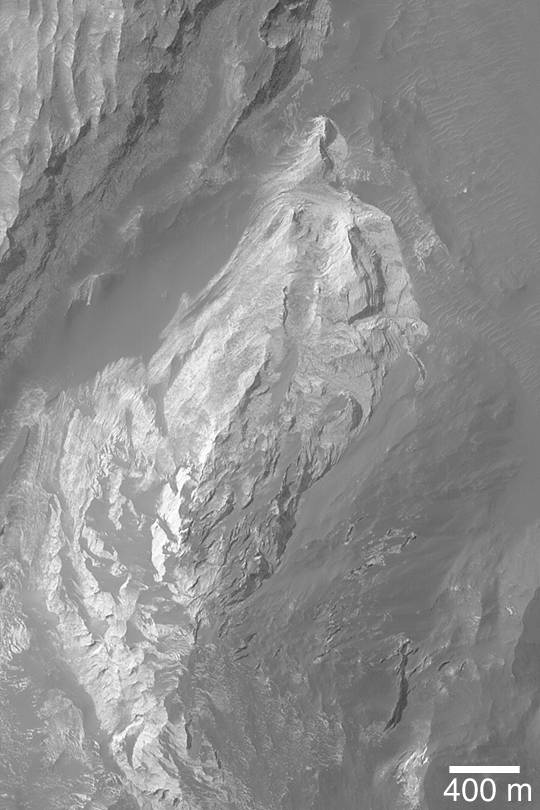
Light toned sedimentary outcrops on the floor of Juventae Chasma.

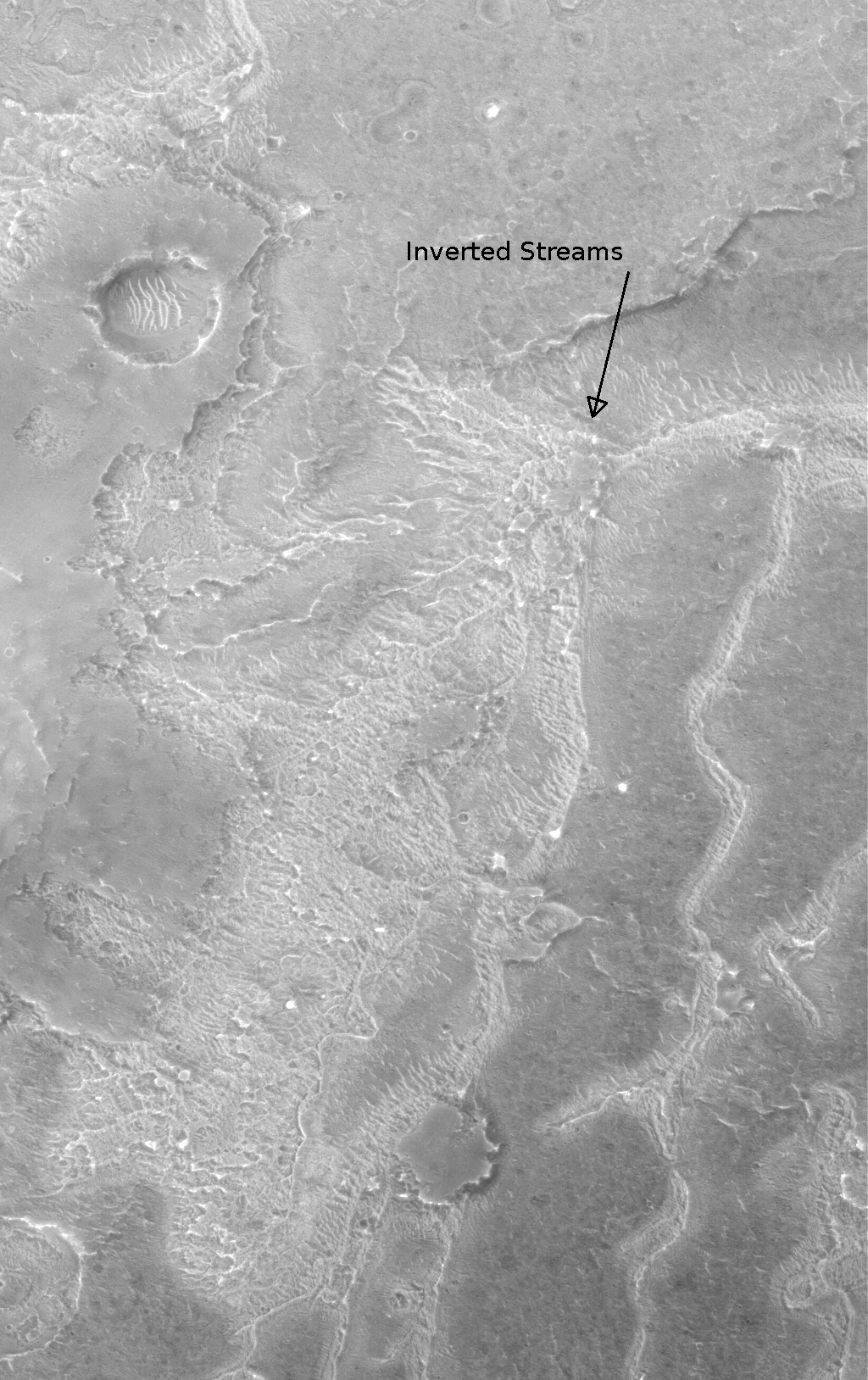
Inverted Streams near Juventae Chasma, as seen by Mars Global Surveyor. These streams begin at the top of a ridge then run together.

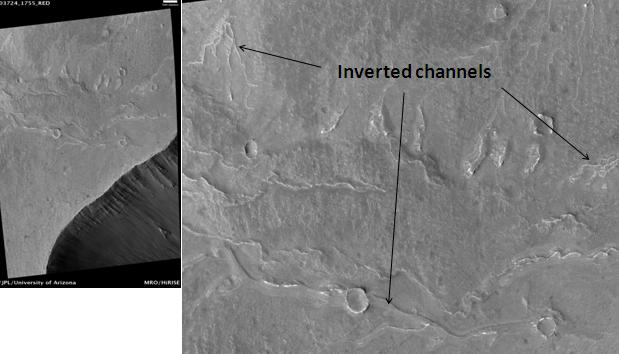
Inverted Channels near Juventae Chasma, as seen by HiRISE. Channels were once regular stream channels. Scale bar is 500 meters long.

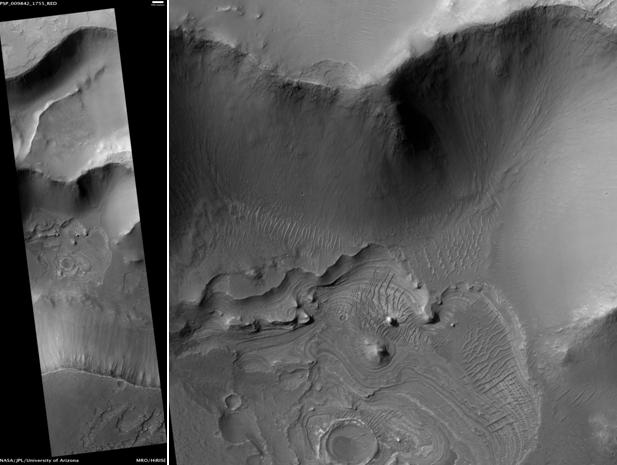
Layers west of Juventae Chasma, as seen by HiRISE. Scale bar is 500 meters long.

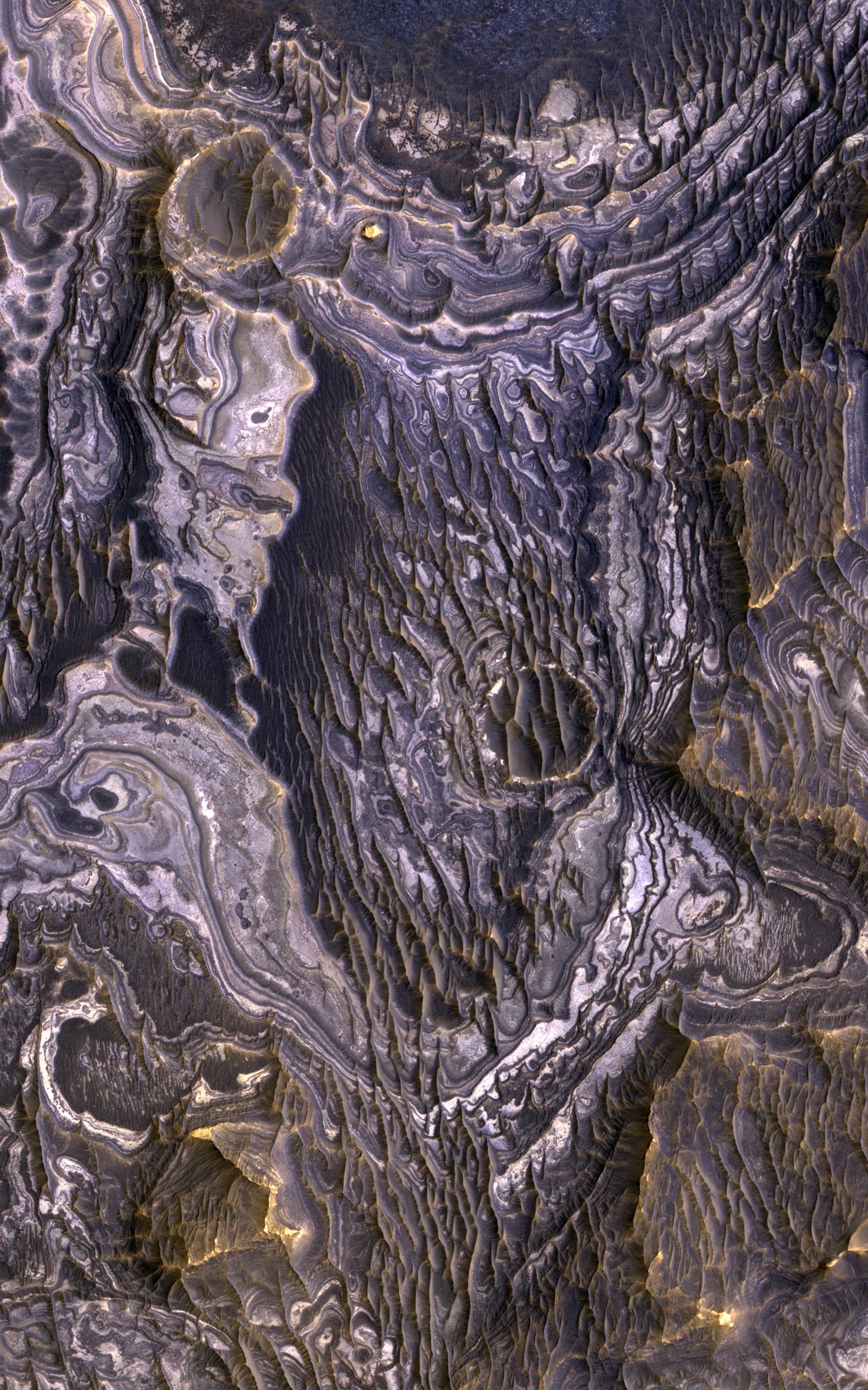
Plateau near Juventae Chasma. Ferric hydroxysulfate (Fe3+SO4OH) has been found here.

== See also ==
- Chasma
- Climate on Mars
- Coprates quadrangle
- Geology of Mars
- HiRISE
- Inverted relief
- Lakes on Mars
- Mars Global Surveyor
- Valley networks (Mars)
