= Amenthes quadrangle =

Map of Mars

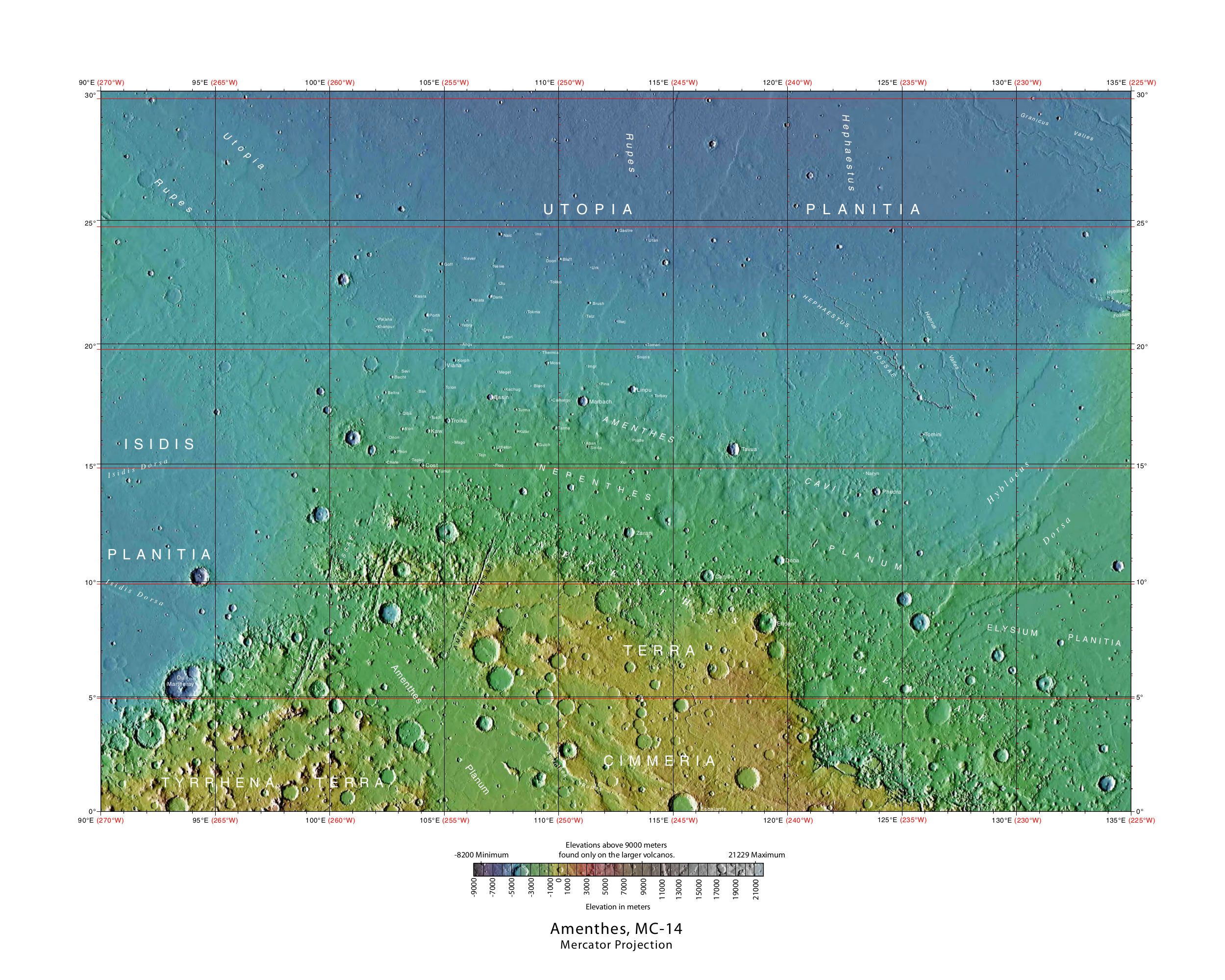
- Map of Amenthes quadrangle from Mars Orbiter Laser Altimeter (MOLA) data. The highest elevations are red and the lowest are blue.
- Coordinates: 15°N 247.5°W

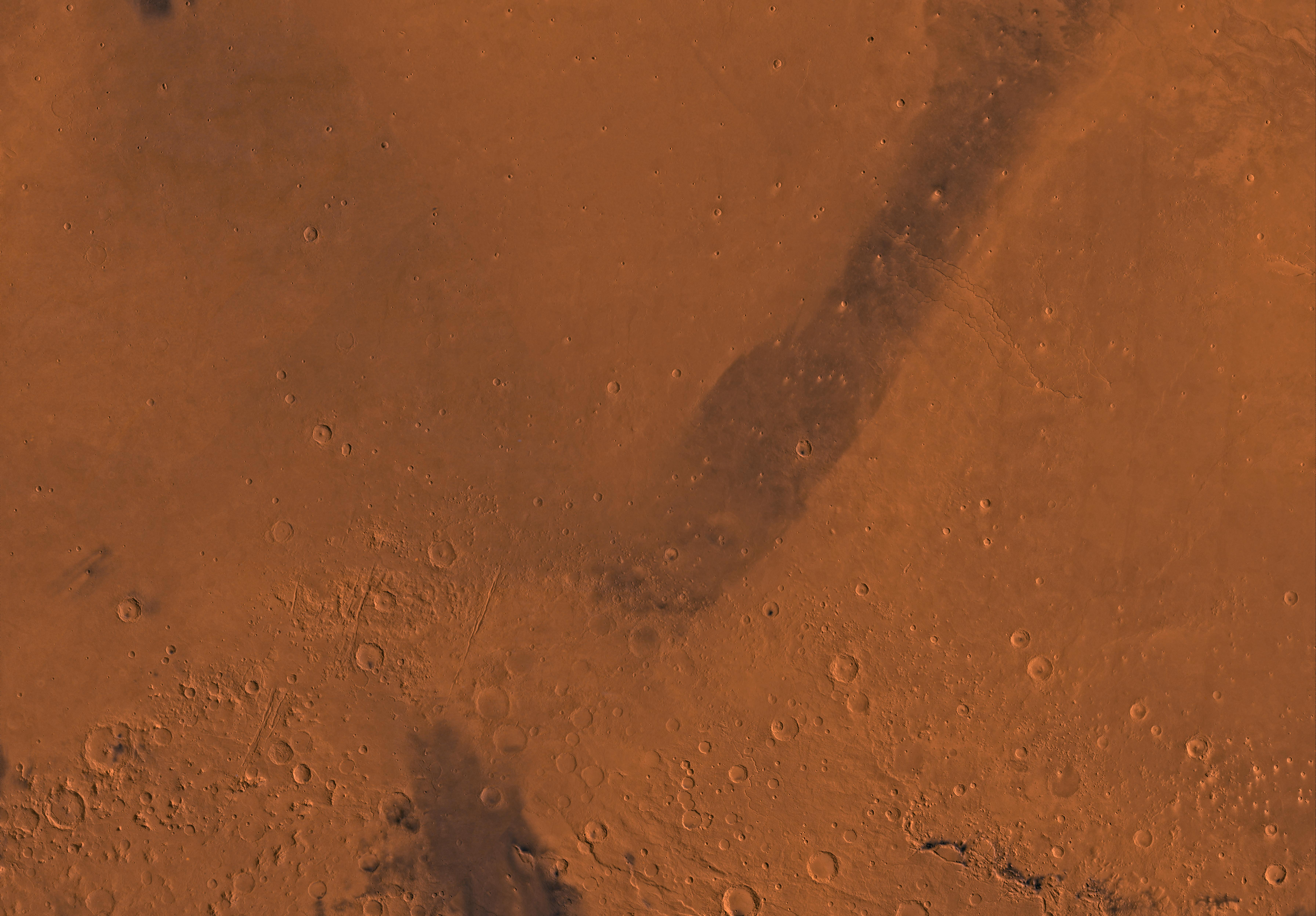
Image of the Amenthes Quadrangle (MC-14). The southern part includes heavily cratered highlands; the northern part contains Elysium Planitia; and the eastern half includes Isidis basin.

The Amenthes quadrangle is one of a series of 30 quadrangle maps of Mars used by the United States Geological Survey (USGS) Astrogeology Research Program. The Amenthes quadrangle is also referred to as MC-14 (Mars Chart-14). The quadrangle covers the area from 225° to 270° west longitude and from 0° to 30° north latitude on Mars. Amenthes quadrangle contains parts of Utopia Planitia, Isidis Planitia, Terra Cimmeria, and Tyrrhena Terra.

The name Amenthes is the Egyptian word for the place where the souls of the dead go.

This quadrangle contains the Isidis basin, a location where magnesium carbonate was found by MRO. This mineral indicates that water was present and that it was not acidic. There are Dark slope streaks, troughs (fossae), and river valleys (Vallis) in this quadrangle.

The Beagle 2 lander was about to land in the quadrangle, particularly in the eastern part of Isidis Planitia, in December 2003, when contact with the craft was lost. In January 2015, NASA reported the Beagle 2 had been found on the surface in Isidis Planitia (location is about 11.5265°N 90.4295°E). High-resolution images captured by the Mars Reconnaissance Orbiter identified the lost probe, which appears to be intact. (see discovery images here)

== Craters ==
Some craters in the Amenthes region (as well as other parts of Mars) show ejecta around them that have lobes. It is believed that the lobed shape is caused by an impact into water or ice logged ground. Calculations suggest that ice is stable beneath the Martian surface.

At the equator the stable layer of ice might lie under as much as 1 kilometer of material, but at higher latitudes the ice may be just a few centimeters below the surface. This was proven when the landing rockets on the Phoenix lander blew away surface dust to reveal an ice surface. The larger an impact crater, the deeper its penetration, a large crater is more likely to have a lobate ejecta since it went down to the ice layer. When even small craters have lobes, the ice level is close to the surface. This idea would be very important for future colonists on Mars who would like to live near a source of water.

Impact craters generally have a rim with ejecta around them, in contrast volcanic craters usually do not have a rim or ejecta deposits. Sometimes craters will display layers. Since the collision that produces a crater is like a powerful explosion, rocks from deep underground are tossed unto the surface. Hence, craters can show us what lies deep under the surface. One crater in the Amenthes quadrangle is believed to be a source of nakhlite meteorites. A team of researchers found that these particular meteorites came from four different eruptions of lava because they showed different ages. The ages were measured by comparing isotopes of the element argon. Since the ages vary from 93 to 1322 million years, the authors concluded that volcanoes grow much more slowly on Mars than the Earth. Many of the volcanoes on the Earth grow much quicker, as they form at plate boundaries. In contrast, Martian volcanoes probably form from plumes.

== Hebrus Valles ==
Hebrus Vales has tributaries, terraces, and teardrop shaped islands. The tear drop shape of the islands indicate what direction the water used to flow. The terraces may be caused by different layers of rocks or from the water being at different levels. These features are common for the rivers of the Earth.

There is evidence that Hebrus Valles region has Karst caves. They may be like the caverns of Earth. Caves can be formed by ancient water dissolving carbonate and sulfate rocks. Researchers have found eight possible cave openings, or "skylights.” This discovery of water-carved caves is a significant finding because evidence of life may exist there since. The cave environment would protect life from the harsh surface environment. In addition, future colonists may be able to live in them.

== See also ==
- Climate of Mars
- Dark slope streaks
- Fossa (geology)
- Geology of Mars
- Hebrus Valles
- HiRISE
- HiWish program
- Hydrothermal circulation
- Impact crater
- List of quadrangles on Mars
- List of craters on Mars
- Ore resources on Mars
- Vallis
- Water on Mars

MC-01 Mare Boreum (features)
| MC-02 Diacria (features) | | MC-03 Arcadia (features) | MC-04 Acidalium (features) | MC-05 Ismenius Lacus (features) | | MC-06 Casius (features) | MC-07 Cebrenia (features) |
| MC-08 Amazonis (features) | MC-09 Tharsis (features) | MC-10 Lunae Palus (features) | MC-11 Oxia Palus (features) | MC-12 Arabia (features) | MC-13 Syrtis Major (features) | MC-14 Amenthes (features) | MC-15 Elysium (features) |
| MC-16 Memnonia (features) | MC-17 Phoenicis Lacus (features) | MC-18 Coprates (features) | MC-19 Margaritifer Sinus (features) | MC-20 Sinus Sabaeus (features) | MC-21 Iapygia (features) | MC-22 Mare Tyrrhenum (features) | MC-23 Aeolis (features) |
| MC-24 Phaethontis (features) | | MC-25 Thaumasia (features) | MC-26 Argyre (features) | MC-27 Noachis (features) | | MC-28 Hellas (features) | MC-29 Eridania (features) |
MC-30 Mare Australe (features)
