= Thaumasia Plateau =

Sloping volcanic plain in Mars

The Thaumasia Plateau is a vast sloping volcanic plain in the western hemisphere of Mars, and is the most extensive component of the Tharsis Rise by area. Syria Planum, Solis Planum, Sinai Planum, and Thaumasia Planum are the constituent sectors of the plateau, which sits between 8 km and 4 km above the surrounding southern highlands. It is bounded by vestigial basement terrains that predate the formation of Tharsis. This area has been proposed to be a drainage basin that sourced the floodwaters forming the outflow channels surrounding Chryse Planitia.

== Context ==
The Thaumasia Plateau lies at the heart of the Tharsis Rise, and is framed to the northwest by the Noctis Labyrinthus fracture zone and the Valles Marineris chasmata (particularly, Ius Chasma, Melas Chasma, and Coprates Chasma, from northwest to northeast). Older Noachian basement crust, likely predating the formation of Tharsis, bound the Thaumasia Plateau to the west (Claritas Rise and the Claritas Fossae), the south (Thaumasia highlands), and the east (Coprates Rise and the Nectaris Fossae). The plateau stretches over 2900 km across the surface of Mars and sits at around a 4 km relief relative to the southern highland terrains immediately surrounding the Tharsis Rise.

There are two general provinces composing the Thaumasia Plateau. The northwestern section of the plateau is composed of high plains of Syria Planum, Solis Planum, and Sinai Planum. Thaumasia Planum forms a lower elevation region in the east, abutting the Coprates Rise.

In general, the plateau's highest elevation rests in its northwest corner, closest to its hinge between Noctis Labyrinthus and the Claritas Fossae at the approach of Syria Planum to Pavonis Mons. At this location, the relief of the Thaumasia Plateau reaches up to 8 km relative to the surrounding highlands terrain. The topography diminishes to the southeast towards Argyre Planitia.

== Geology ==
Some authors have suggested that the Thaumasia Plateau was once a large, ancient drainage basin pre-dating the extensive volcanic formation of the Tharsis Rise. At this time, it was likely bounded by the same structures (the Claritas Rise to the west, the Thaumasia highlands to the south, and the Coprates Rise to the east). During Tharsis' Stage 2 (centered over the central section of the Valles Marineris) and Stage 3 volcanotectonic activity (in which tectonic activity became radially centered over the northwestern portion of Syria Planum), significant volcanic activity is understood to have infilled this basin, forming the modern plains terrains observed in the modern period. The burial of this putative drainage basin has been proposed as a source of the catastrophic floodwaters that are hypothesized to have formed the circum-Chryse outflow channels, and the northwestern slope valleys (NSVs) to the northwest of the Tharsis Rise.

A number of highly dissected features with summit depressions are present as isolated mountains across the Coprates Rise, the Thaumasia highlands, Daedalia Planum, and Terra Sirenum and are thought to be the ancient edifices of highland volcanic activity. Despite their location and morphology, they have been stratigraphically found to cross-cut younger terrains (ranging from Noachian to early Hesperian age) and thus are probably not the remnant massifs of a putative Tharsis impact basin. These putative ancient volcanoes are morphologically distinct from the Hesperian period Tharsis shield volcanoes; they have been hypothesized to be composed of interbedded layers of lava and pyroclastic rock comparable to terrestrial stratovolcanoes. If this analogy holds, it is possible that these explosions were explosive, and possibly even phreatomagmatic (water ice/magma interaction-driven). These volcanoes are observed to approximate features observed elsewhere on Mars, including Hecates Tholus on the Elysium Rise; Tyrrhena Patera; Hadriaca Patera; and Apollinaris Patera.

Later volcanic activity on the Thaumasia Plateau occurred in the Hesperian in association with a profusion of sheet lavas covering Syria Planum, Solis Planum, Sinai Planum, and Thaumasia Planum, emanating from the eastern flanks of the Arsia Mons region. In Thaumasia Planum and against the Coprates Rise, these sheet lavas were observed to onlap underlying plains materials and their associated ridged morphologies. Further volcanism occurred to the south of the Thaumasia highlands in Daedalia Planum.

Some authors have analogized the Thaumasia Plateau to instances of intraplate regional-scale plateau uplifts, including the Colorado Plateau (southwestern United States), the Rhenish shield (western Germany), and the Deccan Plateau and Karnataka Plateau (southern India). A proposed mechanism for the formation of the Thaumasia Plateau invokes mantle convection eroding the crustal root underlying the province, rapidly inducing a regional-scale uplift.

Erosional valleys in the southern margins of the Thaumasia Plateau are conspicuous and common, and are often sourced from deeply dissected terrains, volcanoes, or large (>50 km diameter) impact craters (such as Lowell Crater and Voeykov Crater.). Although it is unlikely that precipitation recharged the fluid systems that eroded these valleys, hydrothermal systems have been invoked as a source. The shock of impact cratering events in water-saturated target rock is thought to cause either the catastrophic release of groundwater or the induction of a subsurface hydrothermal system. Alternatively, this heat may be supplied by magmatic intrusions that underlie rifts, or by magmatic piping supplying volcanic surface activity. Intrusive activity of this sort has been proposed to have sourced the Warrego Valles in the Thaumasia Highlands. It has also been proposed in the southern Coprates Rise and in a rift in the southwestern sector of the plateau proper.

== See also ==
- List of plains on Mars
- Geology of Mars
