= True polar wander on Mars =

Fluctuation in location of Martian poles

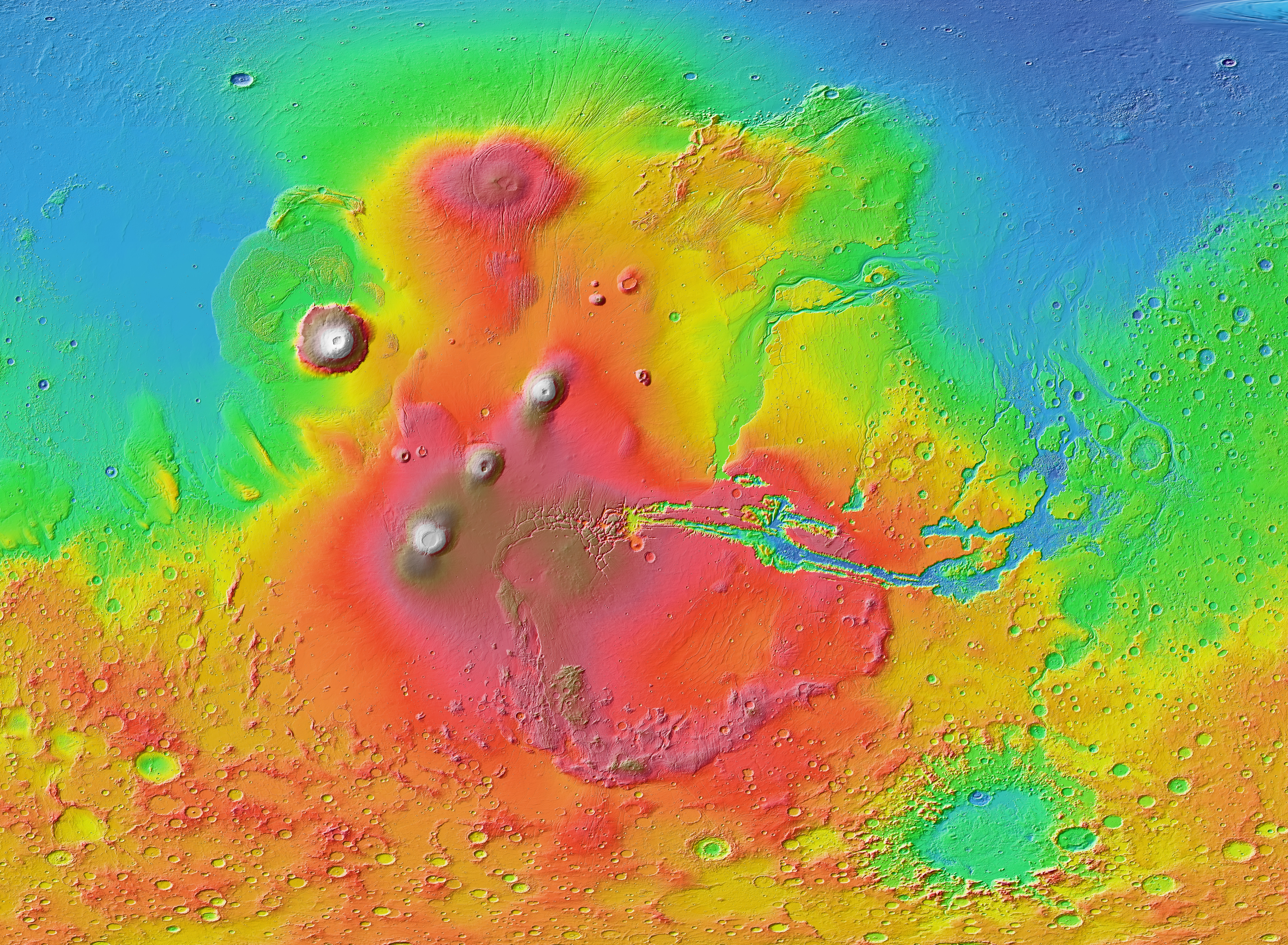
The Tharsis region (shown in shades of red and brown) dominates the western hemisphere of Mars as seen in this Mars Orbiter Laser Altimeter (MOLA) colorized relief map. Tall volcanoes appear white. The Tharsis Montes are the three aligned volcanoes left of center. Olympus Mons sits off to the northwest. The oval feature in the north is Alba Mons. The canyon system Valles Marineris stretches eastward from Tharsis; from its vicinity, outflow channels that once carried floodwaters extend north.

For some time, scientists have thought that the location of the poles of Mars shifted due to the great mass of volcanic material in the Tharsis dome which includes Olympus Mons, the highest volcano in the Solar System. For a period early in the history of Mars, the poles were about 20 degrees away from their present geographic positions. At that time ice was deposited in a region called Dorsa Argentea Formation. Also, the Martian dichotomy was aligned along the equator. A band of rivers formed at around 25 degrees south carried water from the southern highlands to the northern lowlands. After the polar shift, the location of the dichotomy boundary and the band of river valleys shifted. Dorsa Argentea was no longer at the pole. To produce the change in the pole location, the tilt of the planet remained unchanged, rather the crust and mantle moved. They rotated around the core.

This study suggests that the volcanoes and the movement of the poles occurred at about the same time. Volcanoes were erupting when the rivers were flowing with water. Perhaps the volcanoes supplied much water to the atmosphere, as well as carbon dioxide to warm the atmosphere; these effects would provide water for the rivers.

Tharsis is found in the Amazonis quadrangle and the Tharsis quadrangle.

== See also ==
- True polar wander
- Geography of Mars
- Geology of Mars
- Volcanism on Mars
