= Tharsis Montes =

Montes on Mars

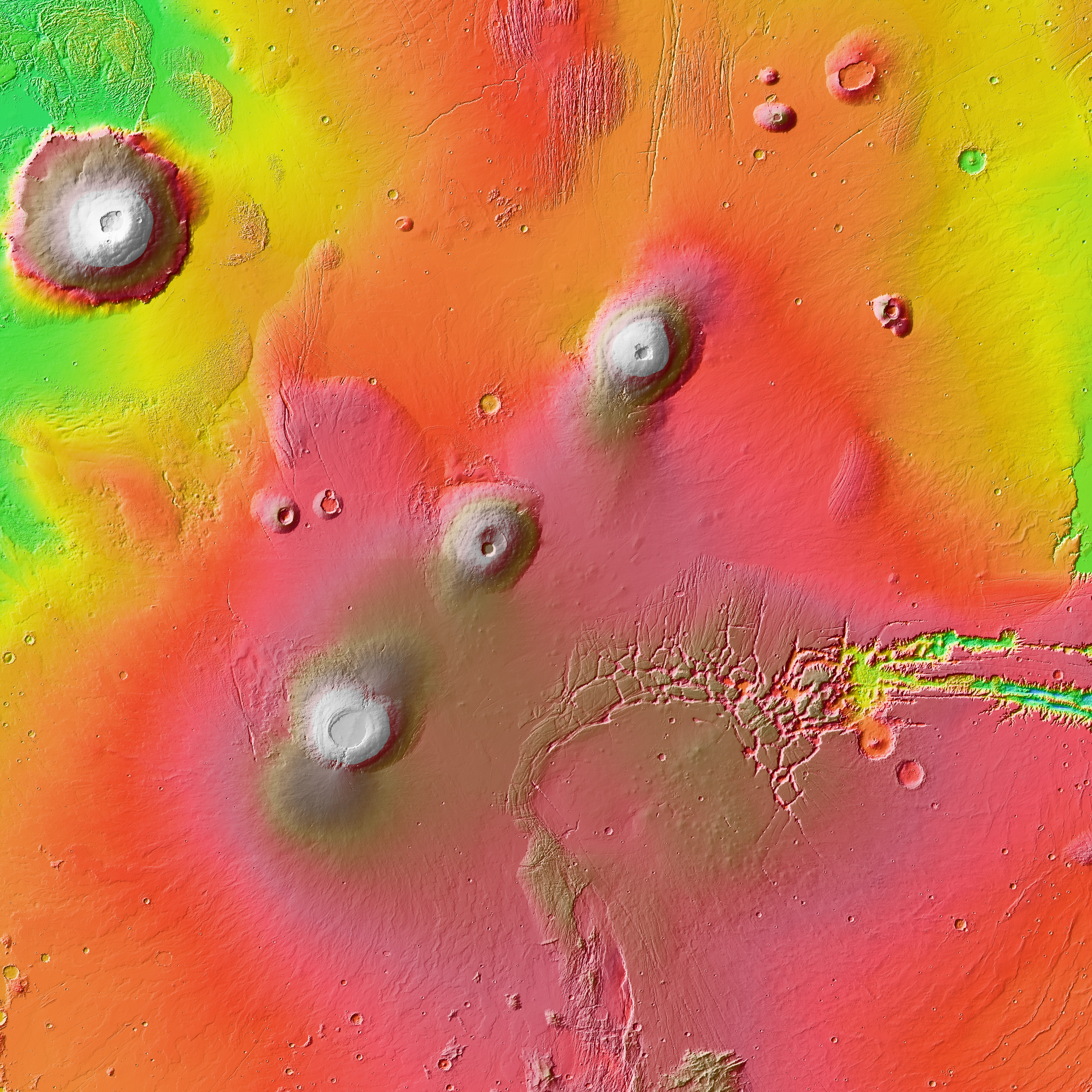
- MOLA topographic map of the Tharsis Montes and their surroundings. Olympus Mons is at upper left; the western end of the Valles Marineris canyon system, with Noctis Labyrinthus, is at right.
- Location: Tharsis Region
- Coordinates: 1.57°N 112.58°W
- Peak: Ascraeus Mons (18.2 km)
- Discoverer: Mariner 9

The Tharsis Montes (/ˈθɑːrsɪs ˈmɒntiːz/) are three large shield volcanoes in the Tharsis region of the planet Mars. From north to south, the volcanoes are Ascraeus Mons, Pavonis Mons and Arsia Mons. Mons (plural montes) is the Latin word for mountain; it is a descriptor term used in astrogeology for mountainous features in the Solar System.

The three Tharsis Montes volcanoes are enormous by terrestrial standards, ranging in diameter from 375 km (233 mi) (Pavonis Mons) to 475 km (295 mi) (Arsia Mons). Ascraeus Mons is the tallest with a summit elevation of over 18 km (59,000 ft), or 15 km (49,000 ft) base-to-peak. For comparison, the tallest volcano on Earth, Mauna Kea in Hawaii, is about 120 km (75 mi) across and stands 9 km (30,000 ft) above the ocean floor.

The Tharsis Montes volcanoes lie near the equator, along the crest of a vast volcanic plateau called the Tharsis region or Tharsis bulge. The Tharsis region is thousands of kilometers across and averages nearly 10 km (33,000 ft) above the mean elevation of the planet. Olympus Mons, the tallest known mountain in the Solar System, is located about 1,200 km (750 mi) northwest of the Tharsis Montes, at the edge of the Tharsis region.

The Tharsis Montes were discovered by the Mariner 9 spacecraft in 1971. They were among the few surface features visible as the spacecraft entered orbit during a global dust storm. Appearing as faint spots through the dusty haze, they were informally christened North Spot, Middle Spot, and South Spot. A fourth spot corresponding to the albedo feature Nix Olympica was also visible and later named Olympus Mons. As the dust cleared, it became obvious that the spots were the tops of enormous shield volcanoes with complex central calderas (collapse craters).

The three Tharsis Montes volcanoes are evenly spaced about 700 km (430 mi) apart from peak to peak, in a line oriented from southwest to northeast. This alignment is unlikely to be coincidental. Several smaller volcanic centers northeast of the Tharsis Montes are on an extension of the line. The three volcanoes, most notably Arsia Mons, also all have collapse features and rifts, from which flank eruptions issued, that transect them along the same northeast–southwest trend. The line clearly represents a major structural feature of the planet, but its origin is uncertain.

== Gallery ==
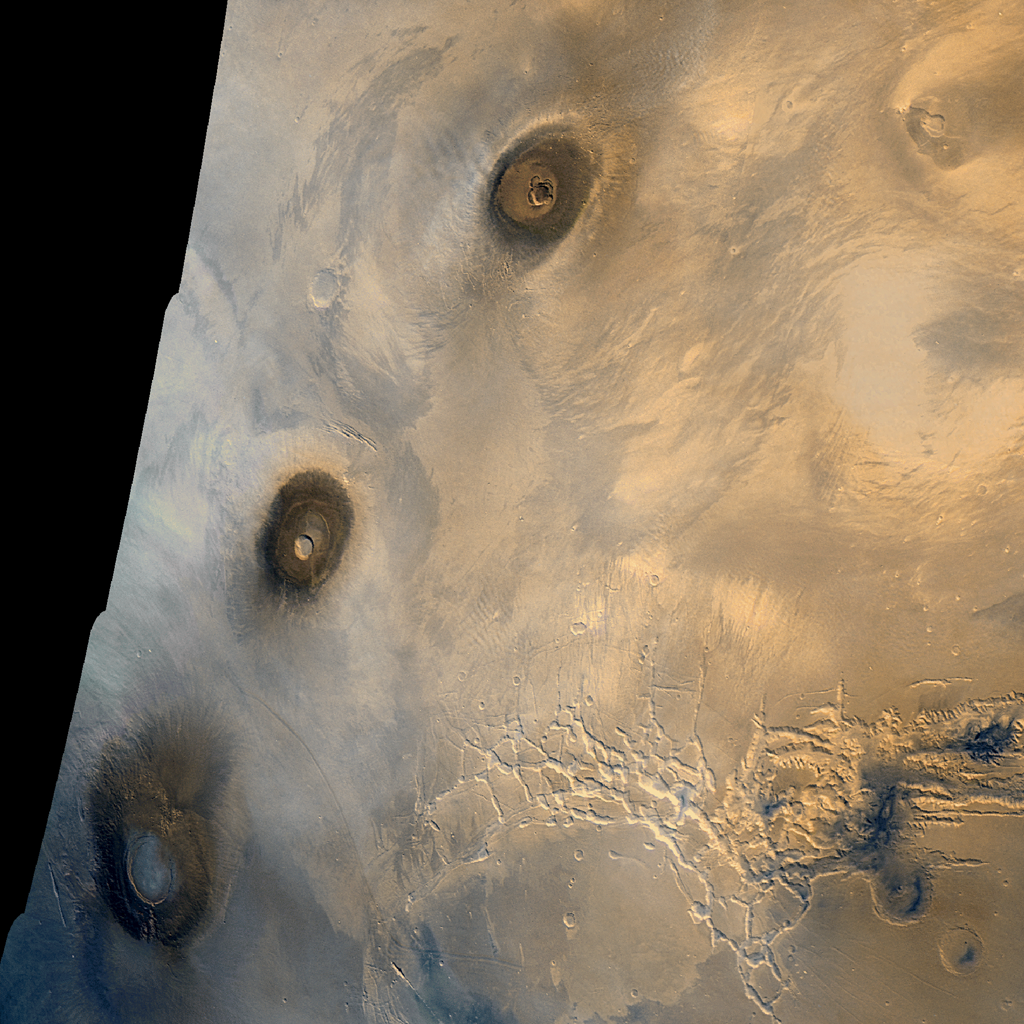
Three volcanoes comprise the Tharsis Montes: Arsia Mons (in the south), Pavonis Mons (at center) and Ascraeus Mons (in the north). Image mosaic is from Viking 1 Orbiter (1980).

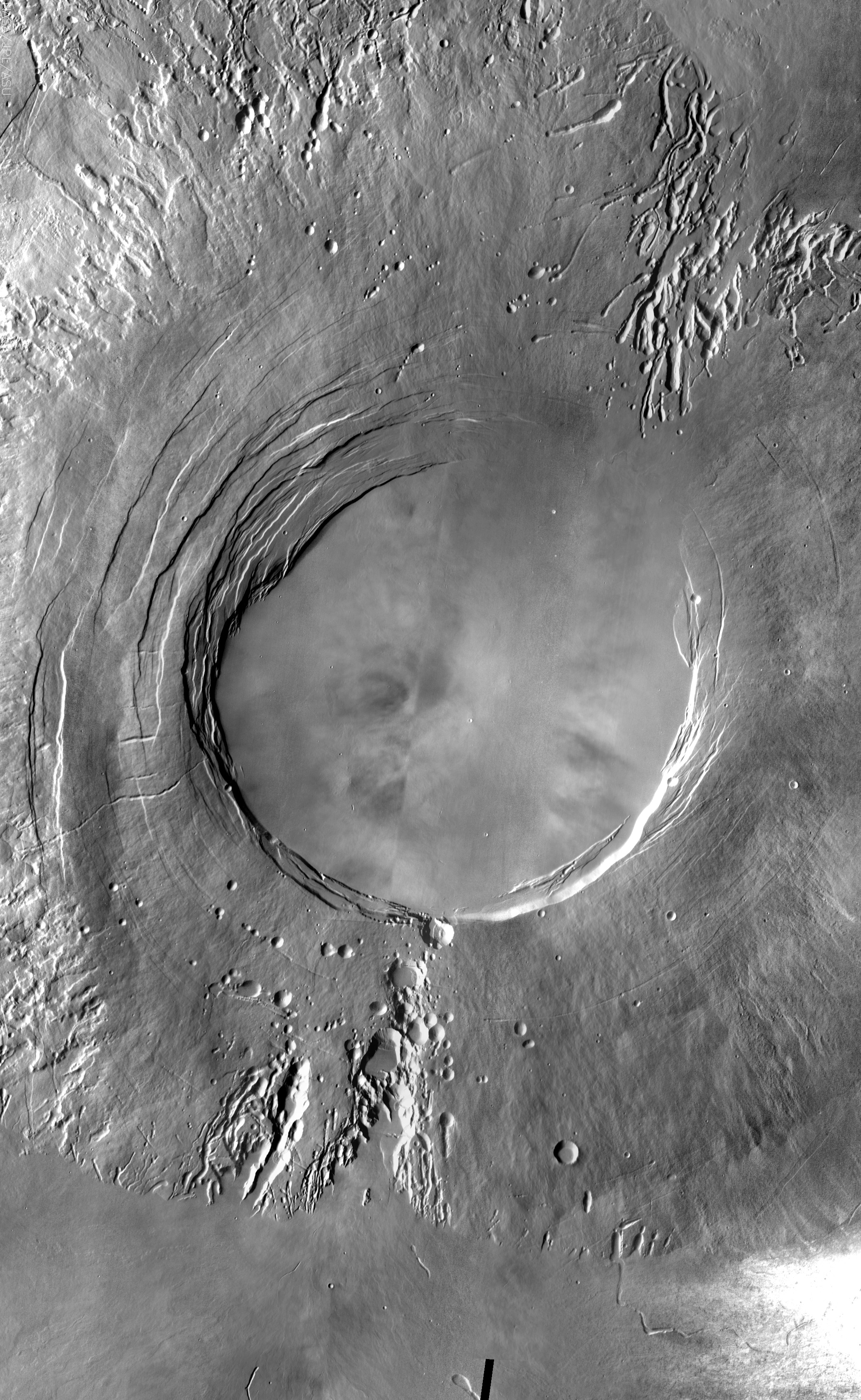
Arsia Mons, southernmost peak of Tharsis Montes.

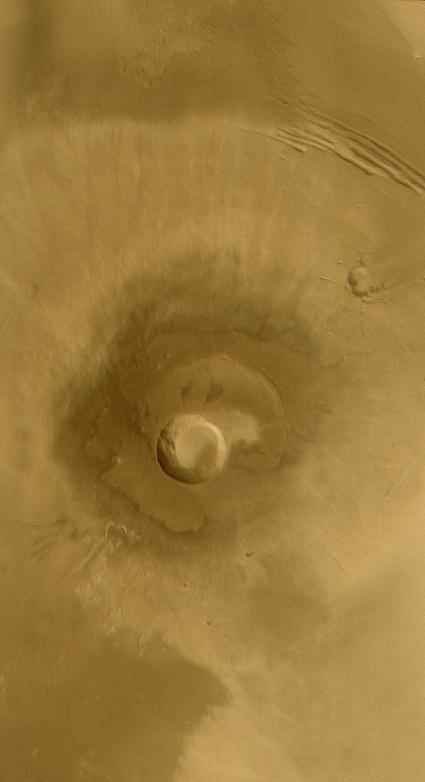
Pavonis Mons, the central peak of Tharsis Montes.

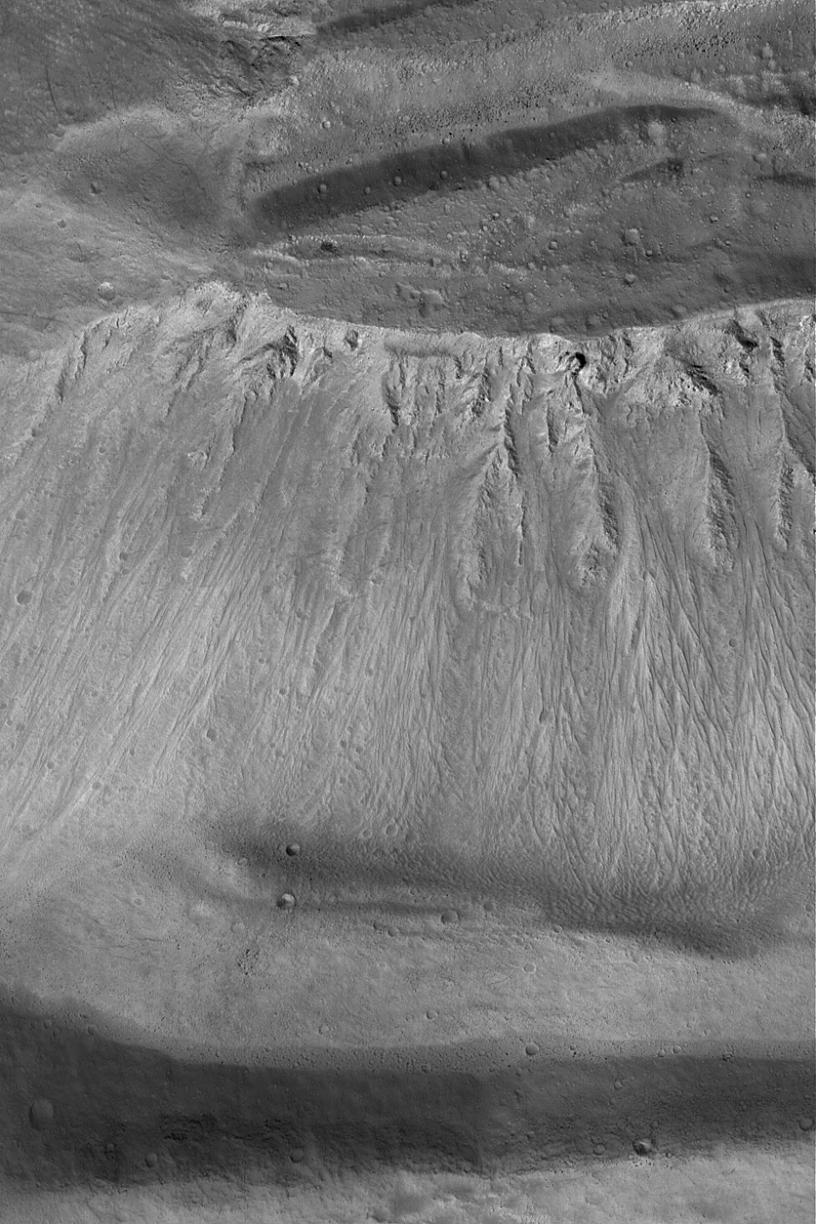
The caldera of Ascraeus Mons, northernmost peak of Tharsis Montes.

== See also ==
- Geography of Mars
- List of mountains on Mars by height
- List of tallest mountains in the Solar System
- Tharsis plateau
- True polar wander on Mars
- Volcanism on Mars
