= Tharsis =

Volcanic plateau on Mars

Tharsis rise
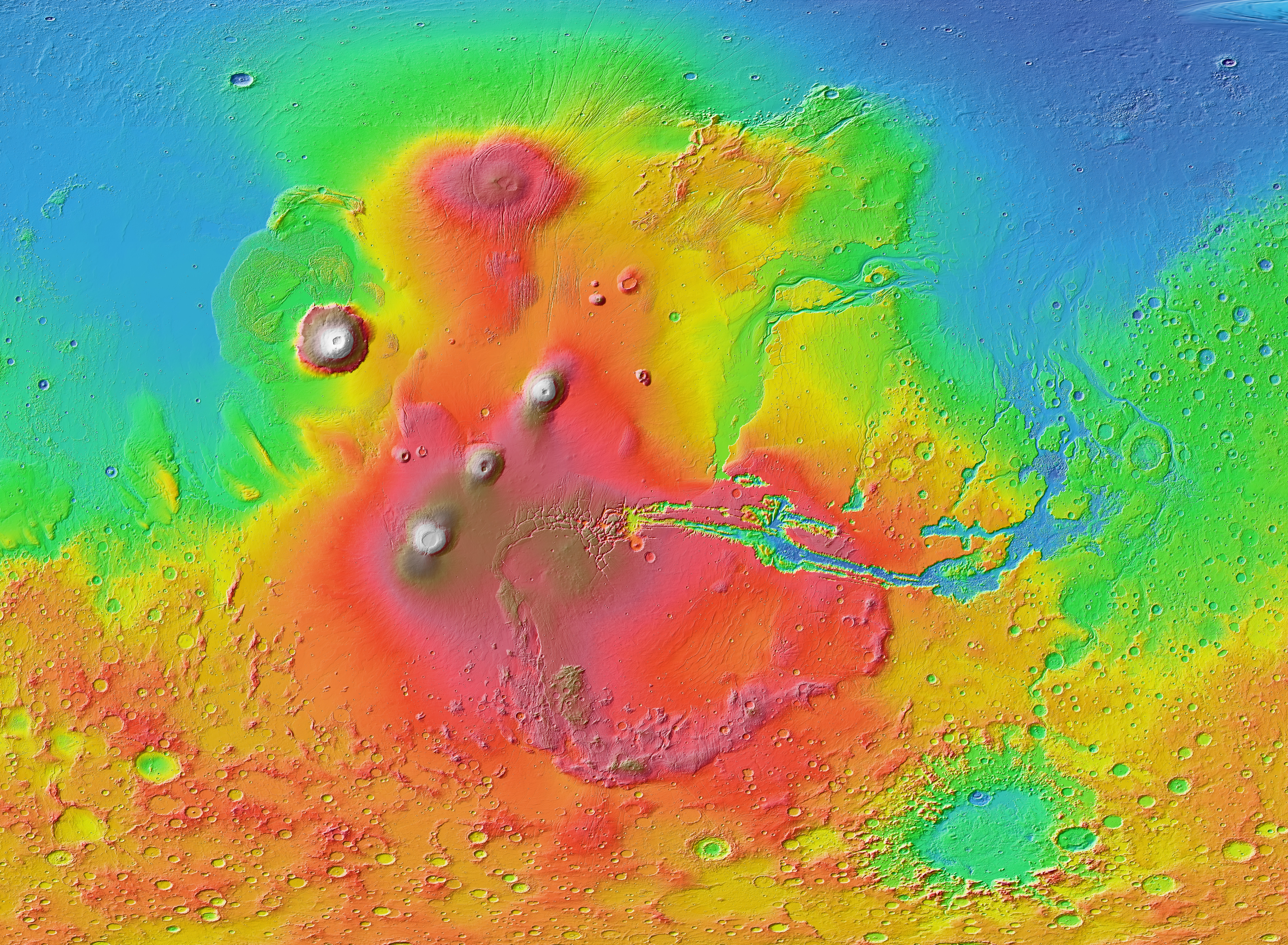
- The Tharsis region (shown in shades of red and brown) dominates the western hemisphere of Mars as seen in this Mars Orbiter Laser Altimeter (MOLA) colorized relief map.
- Feature type: Volcanic plateau, volcanic province
- Location: Western hemisphere of Mars
- Coordinates: 0°00′N 260°00′E
- Diameter: ~5 000 km
- Peak: ~7 km (excluding volcanoes)
- Eponym: Tarshish

Tharsis (/ˈθɑːrsɪs/, THAR-sis) is a vast volcanic plateau centered near the equator in the western hemisphere of Mars. (Note: Officially, "Tharsis" is an albedo feature.) The region is home to the largest volcanoes in the Solar System, including the three enormous shield volcanoes Arsia Mons, Pavonis Mons, and Ascraeus Mons, which are collectively known as the Tharsis Montes. Current consensus is that Tharsis overlays a hot spot, similar to those thought to underlay volcanic island chains on Earth.

The tallest volcano on the planet, Olympus Mons, is often associated with the Tharsis region but is actually located off the western edge of the plateau. The name Tharsis is the Greco-Latin transliteration of the biblical Tarshish, the land at the western extremity of the known world.

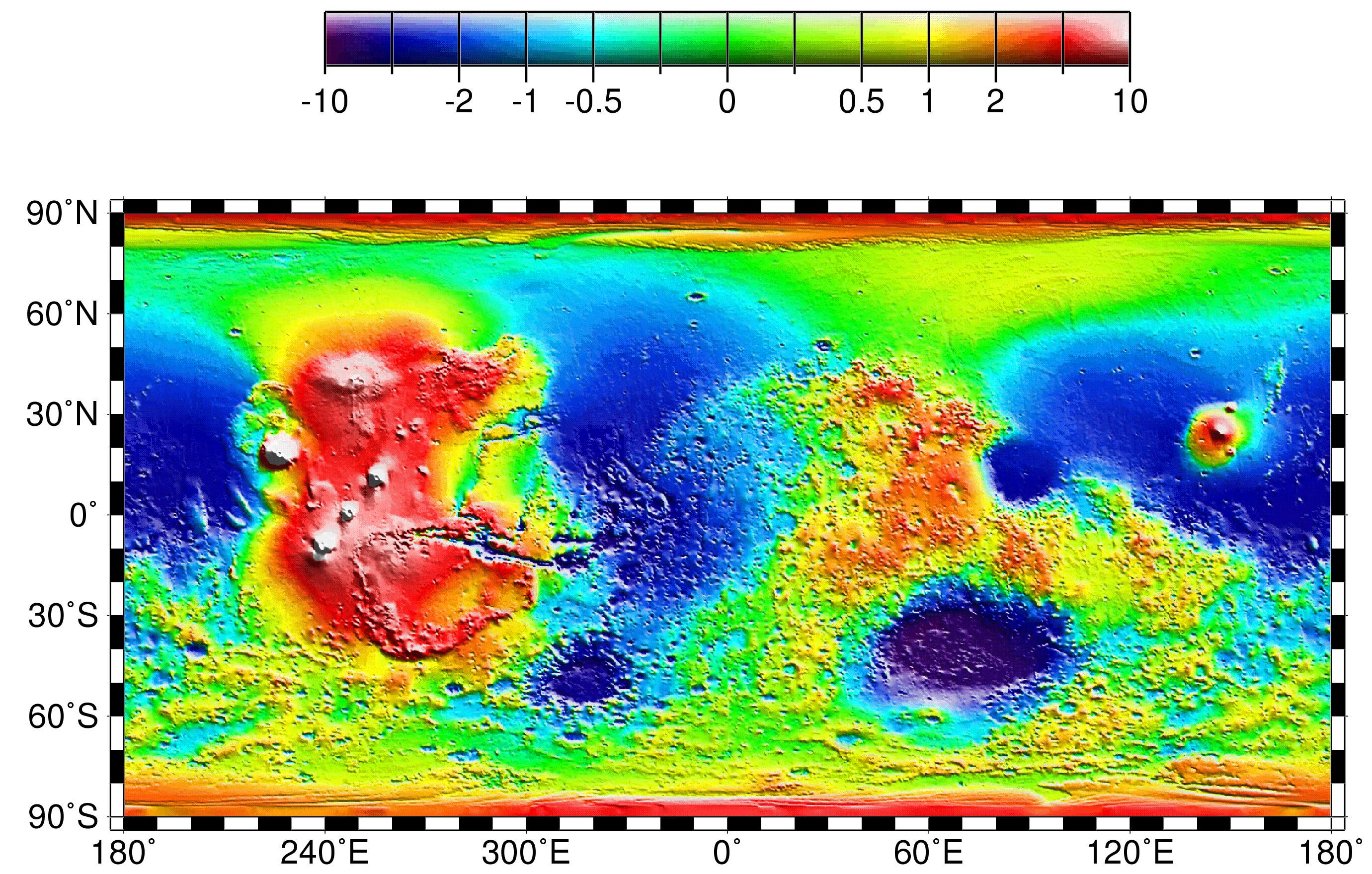
Global topography of Mars based on MOLA data. The Tharsis bulge is the large area at left (shown in shades of red and white). Amazonis and Chryse Planitiae are the blue areas left (west) and right (east) of Tharsis, respectively. In this image, the higher average elevation of the southern hemisphere (zonal spherical harmonic degree 1) has been removed to highlight the elevation contrast of Tharsis with the rest of the planet.

Tharsis can have many meanings depending on historical and scientific context. The name is commonly used in a broad sense to represent a continent-sized region of anomalously elevated terrain centered just south of the equator around longitude 265°E. Called the Tharsis bulge or Tharsis rise, this broad, elevated region dominates the western hemisphere of Mars and is the largest topographic feature on the planet, after the global dichotomy.

== Location ==
Tharsis has no formally defined boundaries, so precise dimensions for the region are difficult to give. In general, the bulge is about 5,000 kilometres (3,100 mi) across and up to 7 kilometres (4.3 mi) high (excluding the volcanoes, which have much higher elevations). It roughly extends from Amazonis Planitia (215°E) in the west to Chryse Planitia (300°E) in the east. The bulge is slightly elongated in the north–south direction, running from the northern flanks of Alba Mons (about 55°N) to the southern base of the Thaumasia highlands (about 43°S). Depending on how the region is defined, Tharsis covers 10–30 million square kilometres (4–10 million square miles), or up to 25% of Mars's surface area.

== Extant ==
The greater Tharsis region consists of several geologically distinct subprovinces with different ages and volcano-tectonic histories. The subdivisions given here are informal and may rise all or parts of other formally named physiographic features and regions.

=== North and south ===
Tharsis is divided into two broad rises: a northern and a larger southern rise. The northern rise partially overlies sparsely cratered, lowland plains north of the dichotomy boundary. This region is dominated by Alba Mons and its extensive volcanic flows. Alba Mons is a vast, low-lying volcanic construct that is unique to Mars. Alba Mons is so large and topographically distinct that it can almost be treated as an entire volcanic province unto itself. The oldest part of the northern rise consists of a broad topographic ridge that corresponds to the highly fractured terrain of Ceraunius Fossae. The ridge is oriented north–south and forms part of the Noachian-aged basement on which Alba Mons sits. Also located in the northern rise are lava flows of the Ceraunius Fossae Formation, which are somewhat older than the Amazonian-aged flows that make up much of the central Tharsis region to the south.

MOLA topography of the Thaumasia Plateau (Syria-Thaumasia block) and southern Tharsis. The volcano shown at the left is Arsia Mons. Valles Marineris extends across the northern edge. The areas in brown have the highest elevations on the Tharsis Plateau and may be considered the "summit region" of the Tharsis bulge.

=== Plana ===
The larger southern portion of Tharsis (pictured right) lies on old cratered highland terrain. Its western boundary is roughly defined by the high lava plains of Daedalia Planum, which slope gently to the southwest into the Memnonia and Terra Sirenum regions. To the east, the southern Tharsis bulge consists of the Thaumasia Plateau, an extensive stretch of volcanic plains about 3,000 km wide. The Thaumasia Plateau is bounded to the west by a highly elevated zone of fractures (Claritas Fossae) and mountains (the Thaumasia Highlands) that curves south then east to northeast in a wide arc that has been compared to the shape of a scorpion's tail. The plateau province is bounded to the north by Noctis Labyrinthus and the western three-quarters of Valles Marineris. It is bounded to the east by a north–south oriented ridge called the Coprates rise. These boundaries enclose a broad high plateau and shallow interior basin that include Syria, Sinai, and Solis Plana (see list of plains on Mars). The highest plateau elevations on the Tharsis bulge occur in northern Syria Planum, western Noctis Labyrinthus, and the plains east of Arsia Mons.

=== Montes ===
Between the northern and southern portions of the Tharsis bulge lies a relatively narrow, northeast-trending region defined by the three massive Tharsis Montes volcanoes: Arsia Mons, Pavonis Mons, and Ascraeus Mons. There are a number of smaller volcanic edifices, and adjacent plains consisting of young (mid to late Amazonian) lava flows. The lava plains slope gently to the east where they overlap and embay the older (Hesperian-aged) terrain of Echus Chasma and western Tempe Terra. To the west, the lava plains slope toward a system of immense northwest-oriented valleys up to 200 kilometres (120 mi) wide. These northwestern slope valleys (NSVs) - which debouch into Amazonis Planitia - are separated by a parallel set of gigantic "keel-shaped" promontories. The NSVs may be relics from catastrophic floods of water, similar to the huge outflow channels that empty into Chryse Planitia, east of Tharsis. Central Tharsis is approximately 3,500 kilometres (2,200 mi) long and includes most of the region covered by the Tharsis quadrangle and the northwestern portion of the adjoining Phoenicis Lacus quadrangle to the south.

Olympus Mons and its associated lava flows and aureole deposits form another distinct subprovince of the Tharsis region. This subregion is about 1,600 kilometres (990 mi) across. It lies off the main topographic bulge, but is related to the volcanic processes that formed Tharsis. Olympus Mons is the youngest of the large Tharsis volcanoes.

== Geology ==
=== Composition ===
Tharsis is commonly called a volcano-tectonic province, meaning that it is the product of volcanism and associated tectonic processes that have caused extensive crustal deformation. According to the standard view, Tharsis overlies a hot spot, similar to the one thought to underlie the island of Hawaii. The hot spot is caused by one or more massive columns of hot, low-density material (a superplume) rising through the mantle. The hot spot produces voluminous quantities of magma in the lower crust that is released to the surface as highly fluid, basaltic lava. Because Mars lacks plate tectonics, the lava is able to build up in one region for billions of years to produce enormous volcanic constructs.

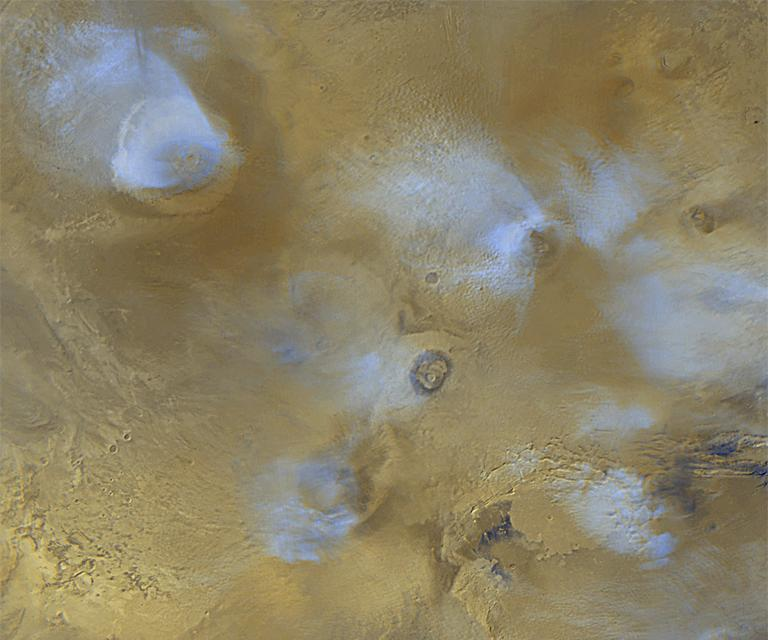
Orographic water ice clouds hover over the volcanic peaks of the central Tharsis region in this color image mosaic from Mars Global Surveyor. Olympus Mons dominates at upper left. At center are the three Tharsis Montes: Arsia Mons at bottom, Pavonis Mons at center, and Ascraeus Mons at top.

On Earth (and presumably Mars as well), not all of the magma produced in a large igneous province erupts at the surface as lava. Much of it stalls in the crust where it slowly cools and solidifies to produce large intrusive complexes (plutons). If the magma migrates through vertical fractures it produces swarms of dikes that may be expressed at the surface as long, linear cracks (fossae) and crater chains (catenae). Magma may also intrude the crust horizontally as large tabular bodies, such as sills and laccoliths, that can cause a general doming and fracturing of the overlying crust. Thus, the bulk of Tharsis is probably made of these intrusive complexes in addition to lava flows at the surface.

One key question about the nature of Tharsis has been whether the bulge is mainly the product of active crustal uplifting from buoyancy provided by the underlying mantle plume or whether it is merely a large, static mass of igneous material supported by the underlying lithosphere. Theoretical analysis of gravity data and the pattern of faults surrounding Tharsis suggest the latter is more likely. The enormous sagging weight of Tharsis has generated tremendous stresses in the crust, producing a broad trough around the region and an array of radial fractures emanating from the center of the bulge that stretches halfway across the planet. A 2026 study that used new information on the Martian lithosphere from NASA's InSight mission found that a flexure model of the lithosphere did not match the long-wavelength gravity field over Tharsis, suggesting that the region is also dynamically supported; it concluded that a large low-density mass anomaly in the mid-mantle beneath Tharsis, either hot buoyant material or depleted mantle, can explain the difference.

=== Age ===
Geologic evidence, such as the flow direction of ancient valley networks around Tharsis, indicates that the bulge was largely in place by the end of the Noachian Period, some 3.7 billion years ago. Although the bulge itself is ancient, volcanic eruptions in the region continued throughout Martian history and probably played a significant role in the production of the planet's atmosphere and the weathering of rocks on the planet's surface.

By one estimate, the Tharsis bulge contains around 300 million km^{3} of igneous material. Assuming the magma that formed Tharsis contained carbon dioxide (CO_{2}) and water vapor in percentages comparable to that observed in Hawaiian basaltic lava, then the total amount of gases released from Tharsis magmas could have produced a 1.5-bar CO_{2} atmosphere and a global layer of water 120 m thick. Martian magmas also likely contain significant amounts of sulfur and chlorine. These elements combine with water to produce acids that can break down primary rocks and minerals. Exhalations from Tharsis and other volcanic centers on the planet are likely responsible for an early period of Martian time (the Theiikian) when sulfuric acid weathering produced abundant hydrated sulfate minerals such as kieserite and gypsum.

Two European Space Agency (ESA) probes have discovered water frost deposits on Tharsis during the morning. Previously, it was thought that water frost on the equator Mars was impossible. Such findings are significant to understanding the present day water cycle on Mars and its habitability.

== True polar wander on Mars ==
The total mass of the Tharsis bulge is approximately 10^{21} kg, about the same as the dwarf planet Ceres. Tharsis is so large and massive that it has likely affected the planet's moment of inertia, possibly causing a change in the orientation of the planet's crust with respect to its rotational axis over time. According to a 2009 study, Tharsis originally formed at about 50°N latitude and migrated toward the equator between 4.2 and 3.9 billion years ago. Such shifts, known as true polar wander, would have caused dramatic climate changes over vast areas of the planet. A 2016 study reported in Nature agreed with the polar wander, but the authors thought the eruptions at Tharsis happened at a slightly different time.

== Volcanism ==
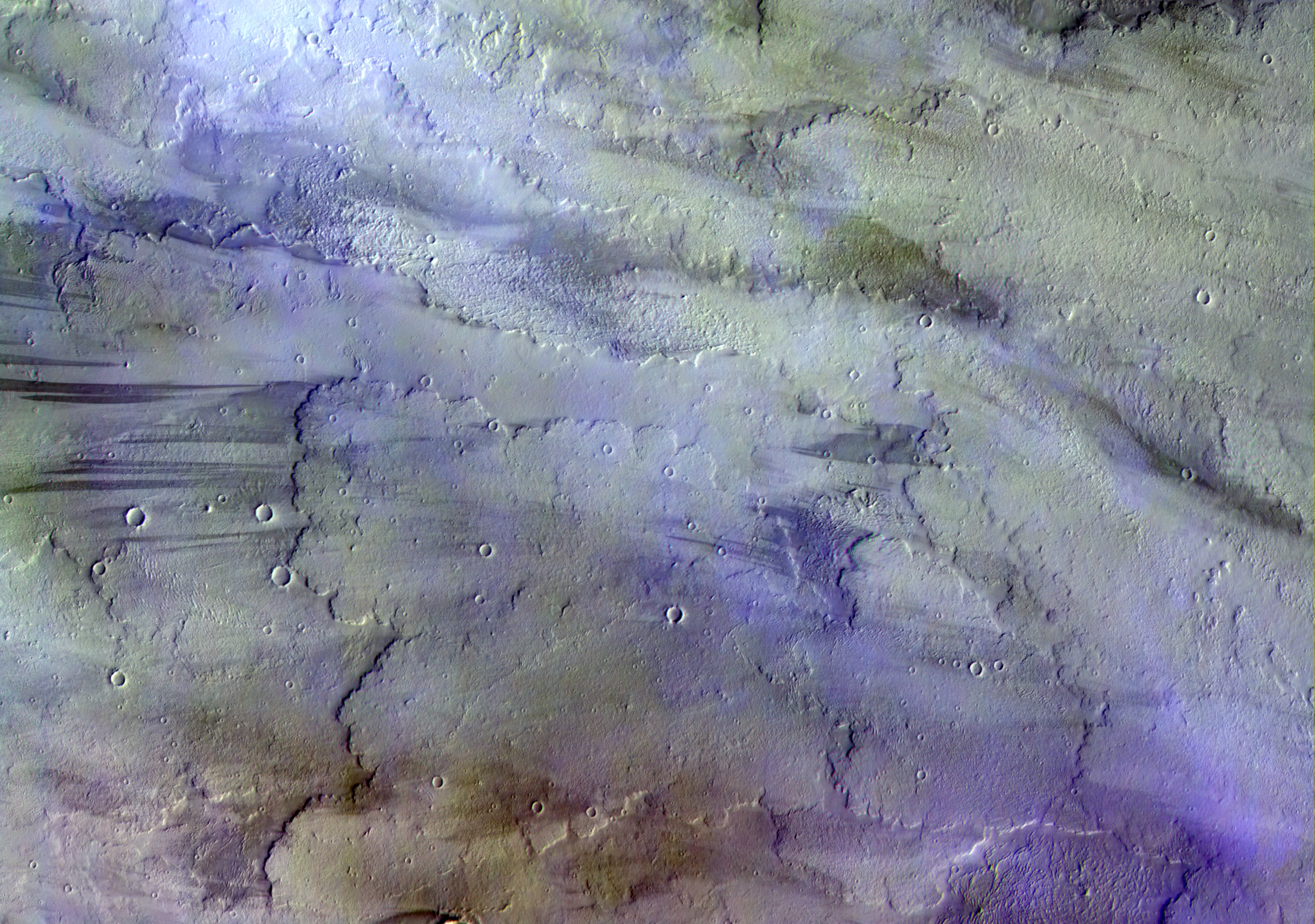
Images of ice water clouds over Tharsis taken by the ExoMars Trace Gas Orbiter, 2016

Spacecraft exploration over the last two decades has shown that volcanoes on other planets can take many unexpected forms. Over the same time period, geologists were discovering that volcanoes on Earth are more structurally complex and dynamic than previously thought. Recent work has attempted to refine the definition of a volcano to incorporate geologic features of widely different shapes, sizes, and compositions throughout the Solar System. One surprising and controversial conclusion from this synthesis of ideas is that the Tharsis region may be a single giant volcano. This is the thesis of geologists Andrea Borgia and John Murray in a Geological Society of America special paper published in 2010.

The key to understanding how a vast igneous province like Tharsis can itself be a volcano is to re-think the notion of volcano from one of simple conical edifice to that of an environment or "holistic" system. According to the conventional view in geology, volcanoes passively build up from lava and ash erupted above fissures or rifts in the crust. The rifts are produced through regional tectonic forces operating in the crust and underlying mantle. Traditionally, the volcano and its magmatic plumbing have been studied by volcanologists and igneous petrologists, while the tectonic features are the subject for structural geologists and geophysicists. However, recent work on large terrestrial volcanoes indicates that the distinction between volcanic and tectonic processes is quite blurry, with significant interplay between the two.

Many volcanoes produce deformational structures as they grow. The flanks of volcanoes commonly exhibit shallow gravity slumps, faults and associated folds. Large volcanoes grow not only by adding erupted material to their flanks, but also by spreading laterally at their bases, particularly if they rest on weak or ductile materials. As a volcano grows in size and weight, the stress field underneath the volcano changes from compressional to extensional. A subterranean rift may develop at the base of the volcano where the crust is wrenched apart. This volcanic spreading may initiate further structural deformation in the form of thrust faults along the volcano's distal flanks, pervasive grabens and normal faults across the edifice, and catastrophic flank failure (sector collapse). Mathematical analysis shows that volcanic spreading operates on volcanoes at a wide range of scales and is theoretically similar to the larger-scale rifting that occurs at mid-ocean ridges (divergent plate boundaries). Thus, in this view, the distinction between tectonic plate, spreading volcano, and rift is nebulous, all being part of the same geodynamic system.

According to Borgia and Murray, Mount Etna in Sicily is a good terrestrial analogue for the much larger Tharsis bulge, which to them is one immense volcano they call Tharsis Rise. Mount Etna is a complex spreading volcano that is characterized by three main structural features: a volcanic rift system that crosses the summit in a north-northeast direction; a peripheral compression belt (thrust front) surrounding the base of the volcano; and an east-northeast trending system of transtensional (oblique normal) faults that connect the summit rift to the peripheral thrust front. The volcano's peak contains an array of steep summit cones, which are frequently active. The entire edifice is also peppered with a large number of small parasitic cones.

The structural similarities of Mount Etna to Tharsis Rise are striking, even though the latter is some 200 times larger. In Borgia and Murray's view, Tharsis resembles a very large spreading volcano. As with Etna, the spreading has produced a rift through the summit of the rise and a system of radial tear faults that connect the rift to a basal compression belt. The tear-fault system on Tharsis is represented by the radial fossae, of which Valles Marineris is the largest example. The thrust front is visible as the Thaumasia Highlands. Unlike on Earth, where the rifting of plates produces a corresponding subduction zone, the thick lithosphere of Mars is unable to descend into the mantle. Instead, the compressed zone is scrunched up and sheared laterally into mountain ranges, in a process called obduction. To complete the analogy, the huge Olympus Mons and the Tharsis Montes are merely summit cones or parasitic cones on a much larger volcanic edifice.

== Tharsis in popular culture ==
- In the Dragonlance Chronicles, the City of Tarsis is a port town which has become landlocked after the Cataclysm led to the recession of the sea. Its waterfront district was located on the west side of the city.
- In Kim Stanley Robinson's Mars trilogy, three major cities—Cairo, Sheffield, and Nicosia—are located in this region, as well as many mentions of Noctis Labyrinthus and the surrounding areas.
- Tharsis appears in the 2002 Japanese manga and anime Voices of a Distant Star, where the first encounter took place between mankind and an alien race referred to as Tarsians.
- In the anime Cowboy Bebop, the headquarters of the Red Dragon Syndicate is in Tharsis City.
- The Tharsis plateau is a main setting of the Horus Heresy novel Mechanicum by Graham McNeill, Book 9 of the Horus Heresy book series. The book includes a story-related map of the region (by illustrator Adrian Wood) in its front matter.
- In the "Der Dieb" episode of Sealab 2021, Captain Murphy proclaims that "[...] as of this moment, I am hereby married to Adrienne Barbeau, queen of Mars from Olympus Mons to Tharsis."
- The video game Red Faction: Guerrilla takes place entirely in the Tharsis region, and implies that the infamous Ultor Corporation's mining complex in the first game had also been in Tharsis.
- In the 2005 novel Spin by Robert Charles Wilson, the return trip to Earth is launched from Tharsis after 100,000 years since Martian colonization, but before Mars is enveloped by the spin.
- In the game Myth II: Soulblighter, Tharsis is the name of a volcano that features heavily in the final level.
- Tharsis is the name of an independent game on Steam based on a mission to the region. However, it does not involve landing there.
- The video game Destiny has a reference to Tharsis in one of their locations named Tharsis Junction.
- One of the Kataphrakts of the anime Aldnoah.Zero is named Tharsis. Its original pilot is part of an organization that serves an empire based on the planet of Mars.
- The "Battle of Tharsis Bulge" is part of the backstory of the Revelation Space series by Alastair Reynolds, and is referenced several times by the Conjoiners.
- In Natasha Pulley's novel The Mars House (published 19 March 2024), Tharsis is the name of a terraformed Mars colony.
- Terraforming Mars includes Tharsis as the base game board (though not explicitly identified as such before expansions). The possible projects the players can take include converting Noctus Labyrinthitus into a city and occupying any of the Tharsis Montes.

== See also ==
- Geography of Mars
- Geology of Mars
- Volcanism on Mars
