= Syria Planum =

Planum on Mars

Syria Planum, as seen from THEMIS

Syria Planum is a broad plateau on surface of Mars, forming part of Tharsis region. It is located at the summit of the Tharsis bulge, and was the center of volcanic and tectonic activity in Martian history from the Noachian to the late Hesperian. It has been confirmed that low shield volcanoes exist in this region.
