= Pavonis Mons =

Martian volcano

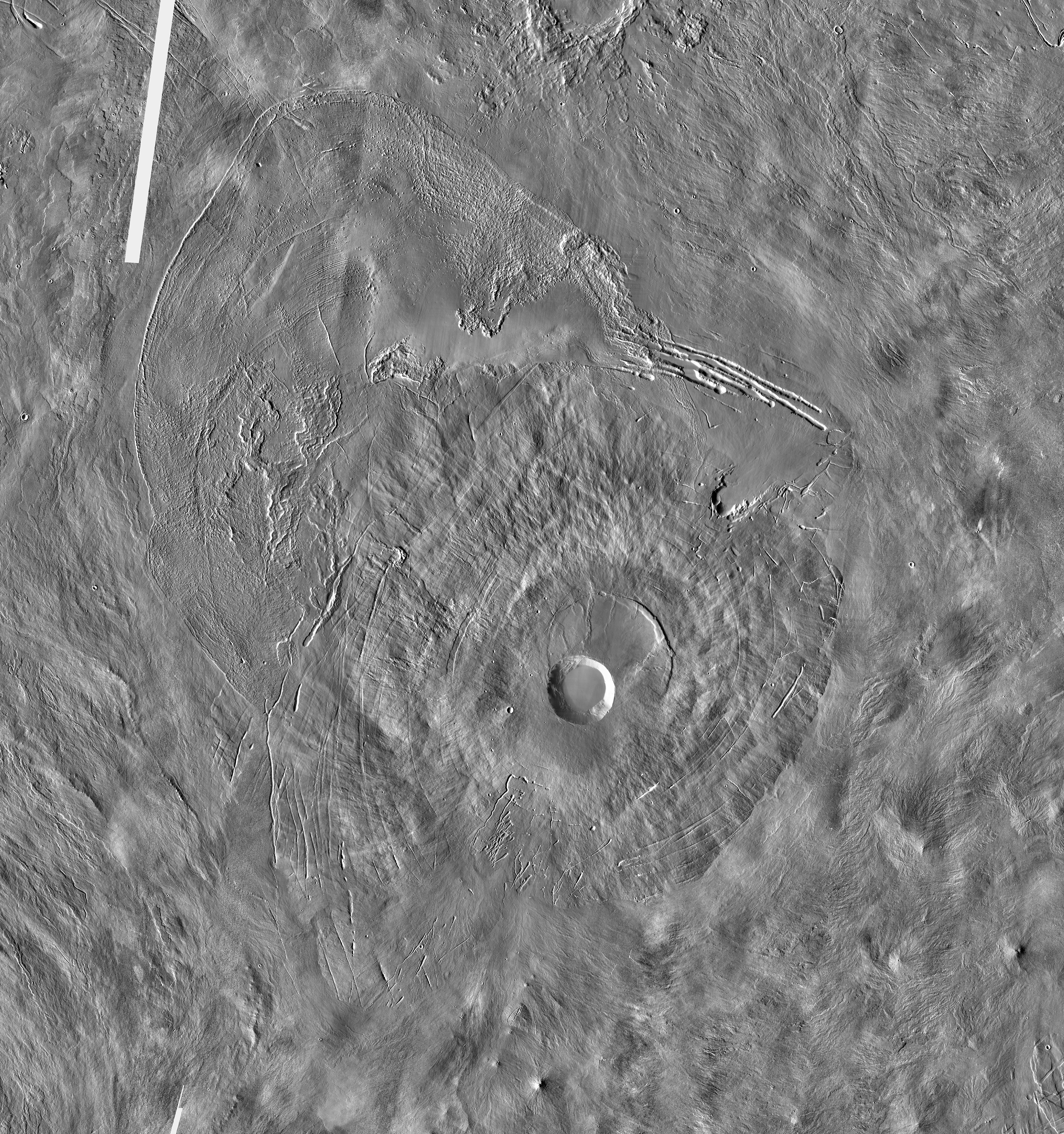
- THEMIS daytime IR mosaic of Pavonis Mons. A large fan-shaped expanse of knobby deposits (the Pavonis Sulci) believed left by past glaciation extends northwestward from the mountain.
- Feature type: Shield volcano
- Coordinates: 1.48°N 247.04°E
- Peak: 8.7 km (5.4 mi) 28,543 ft (8,700 m)
- Discoverer: Mariner 9 (1971)
- Eponym: Latin - Mount Peacock

Pavonis Mons /pəˈvoʊnɪs ˈmɒnz/ (Latin for "peacock mountain") is a large shield volcano located in the Tharsis region of the planet Mars. It is the middle member of a chain of three volcanic mountains (collectively known as the Tharsis Montes) that straddle the Martian equator between longitudes 235°E and 259°E. The volcano was discovered by the Mariner 9 spacecraft in 1971, and was originally called Middle Spot. Its name formally became Pavonis Mons in 1973. The equatorial location of its peak and its height make it the ideal terminus for a space elevator, and it has often been proposed as a space elevator location, especially in science fiction. It is also an ideal location for a Sky Ramp.

== General description ==
Map of Tharsis quadrangle. Pavonis Mons is located at the southern edge.

Pavonis Mons stands at the southern edge of the Tharsis quadrangle - approximately 400 km southwest of Ascraeus Mons (the northernmost of the Tharsis Montes) and 400 km northeast of Arsia Mons (the southernmost member of the chain). The Tharsis Montes volcanoes lie along the crest of a northeast-trending rise (Tharsis bulge) that extends more than 3,000 km across the western equatorial region of Mars. Olympus Mons, the tallest volcano in the Solar System lies at the edge of the Tharsis bulge, about 1,200 km northwest of Pavonis Mons.

Pavonis Mons is the smallest of the Tharsis Montes volcanoes, measuring about 375 km across and standing 14 km above Mars's mean surface level. As a shield volcano, Pavonis Mons has an extremely low profile with flank slopes that average only 4°. The summit contains a deep, circular caldera that is 47 km in diameter and almost 5 km deep. A larger, shallower depression lies immediately northeast of the smaller caldera. The large depression is about 90 km in diameter and structurally more complex than the small caldera.

Like most of the Tharsis region, Pavonis Mons has a high albedo (reflectivity) and low thermal inertia, indicating that the volcano and surrounding areas are covered with large amounts of fine dust (see Martian surface). The dust forms a mantle over the surface that obscures or mutes much of the fine-scale topography and geology of the region. Tharsis is probably dusty because of its high elevations. The summit experiences an atmospheric pressure of around 130 Pa (1.3 mbar), about 21% of Mars's mean surface pressure. The atmospheric density is too low to mobilize and remove dust once it is deposited.

== Geology ==
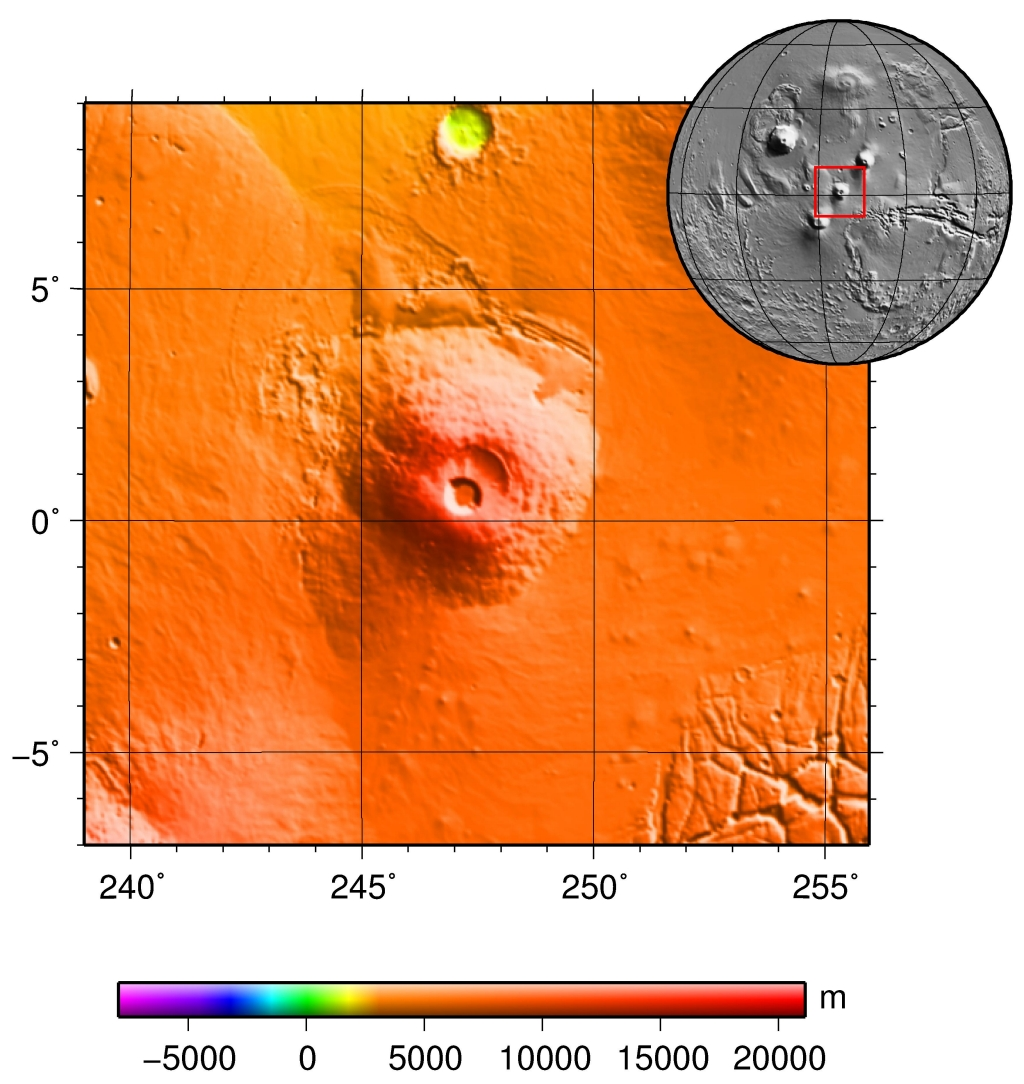
MOLA colorized topography of Pavonis Mons

The bulk of the volcano's surface consists of lava flows of the early Amazonian age. The northern flanks of the volcano are highly faulted with grabens and normal faults concentric to the volcano's summit caldera. To its lower east flank, there is a chain of elliptical, or oval-shaped, pits, lined up down the center of a shallow trough. These features were formed by faulting and associated collapse; the scarp on each side of the trough is a fault line.

=== Glaciers ===
Using MGS and Odyssey data, combined with developments in the study of glaciers, scientists suggest that glaciers once existed on Pavonis Mons and probably still do to some extent. Evidence for this includes concentric ridges (moraines "dropped" by glaciers), a knobby area (caused by ice sublimating), and a smooth section that flows over other deposits (debris-covered glacial ice). The ice could have been deposited when the tilt of Mars changed the climate, thereby causing more moisture to be present in the atmosphere. Studies suggest the glaciation happened in the Late Amazonian period, the most recent period in Mars chronology. Multiple stages of glaciation probably occurred. The ice present today represents one more resource for possible future colonization of the planet.

=== Possible evidence of plate tectonics ===
Pavonis Mons is the middle of three volcanos (collectively known as Tharsis Montes) on the Tharsis bulge near the equator of the planet Mars. The other Tharsis volcanoes are Ascraeus Mons and Arsia Mons. The three Tharsis Montes, together with some smaller volcanoes to the north, form a fairly straight line. It has been proposed that this straight line of volcanoes is the result of the sort of plate motion which on Earth makes chains of "hot spot" volcanoes.

== In popular culture ==
- Pavonis Mons provides the putative setting for the song "Approaching Pavonis Mons by Balloon (Utopia Planitia)" by The Flaming Lips, released as part of the album Yoshimi Battles the Pink Robots.
- In Kim Stanley Robinson's Mars Trilogy, Mars's space elevator has its base on the southern rim of Pavonis – the highest place on the equator – and the city of Sheffield is built around it.
- Pavonis Mons is also the base of Mars's space elevator in the GURPS Transhuman Space roleplaying game setting. The city of New Shanghai, the largest on Mars, is built around the elevator. Deimos is used as the anchor, having been shifted from its current orbit. Pavonis Mons also hosts a space elevator in other GURPS settings, including GURPS Mars.
- Pavonis Mons hosts a space elevator to Deimos in the Buck Rogers in the 25th Century franchise.
- Pavonis Mons is the name of a Settlement Defense Front destroyer in the game Call of Duty: Infinite Warfare in the mission "Operation Deep Execute", Captain Khosi Siyada was the ship's commander.

== Gallery ==
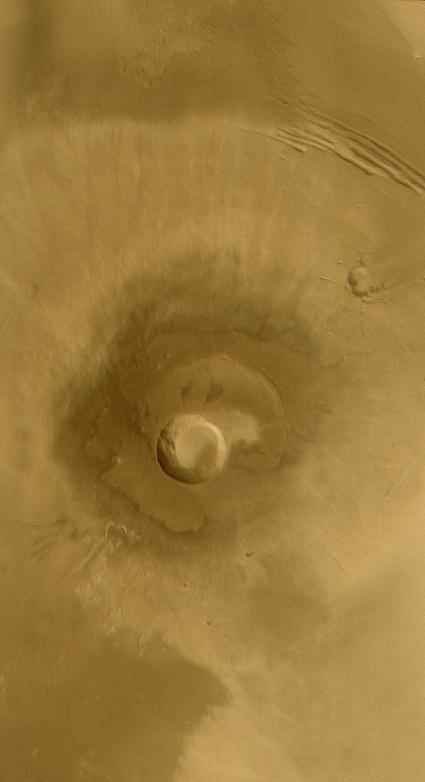
Mars Global Surveyor (MGS) Mars Orbiter Camera (MOC) wide angle color composite image

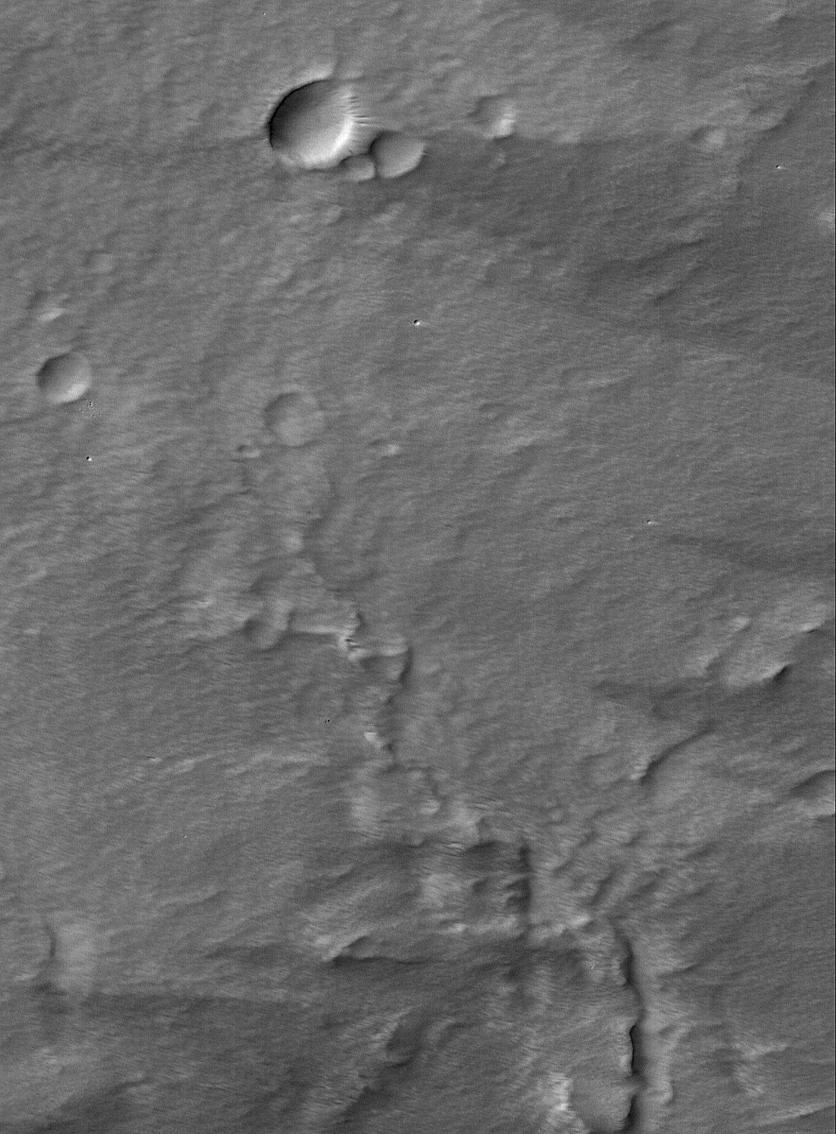
Mars Global Surveyor MOC image showing mantle of dust near summit of Pavonis Mons. The dust makes the image look blurry.

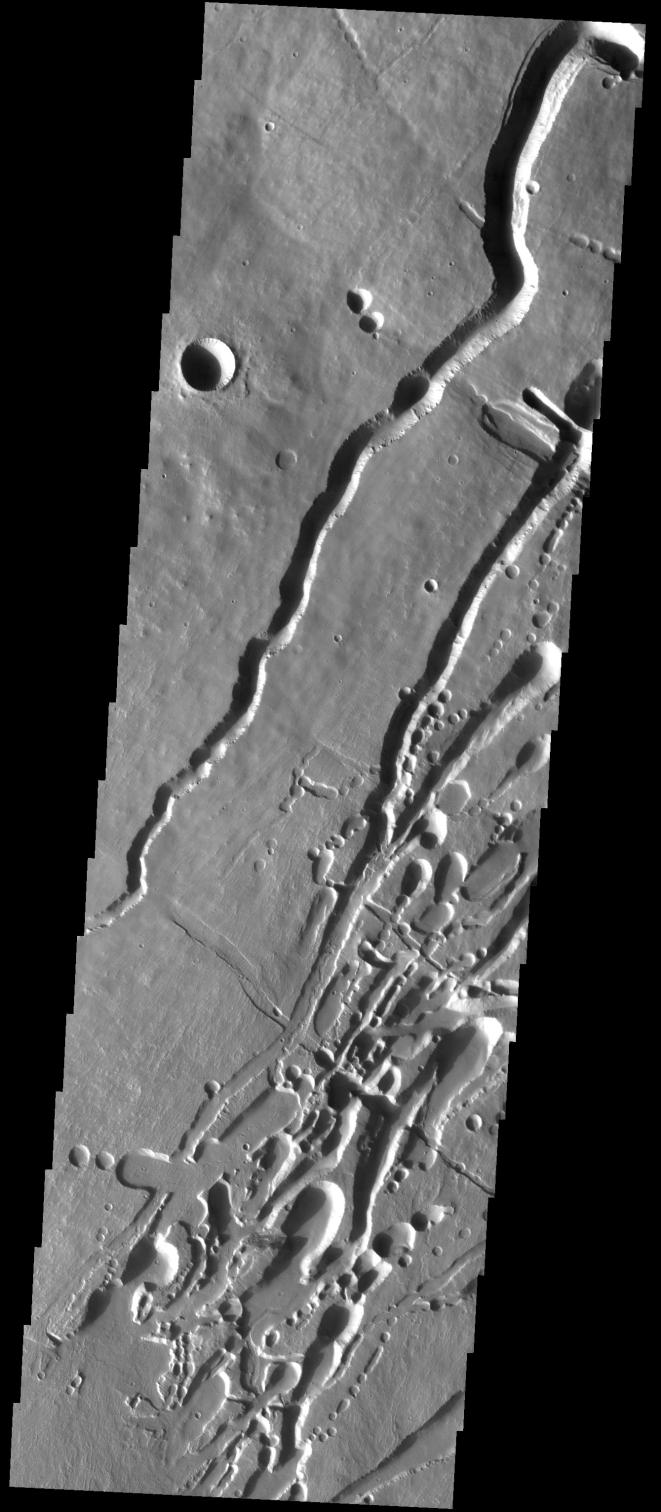
THEMIS image of channels and pits on southern flank of Pavonis Mons.

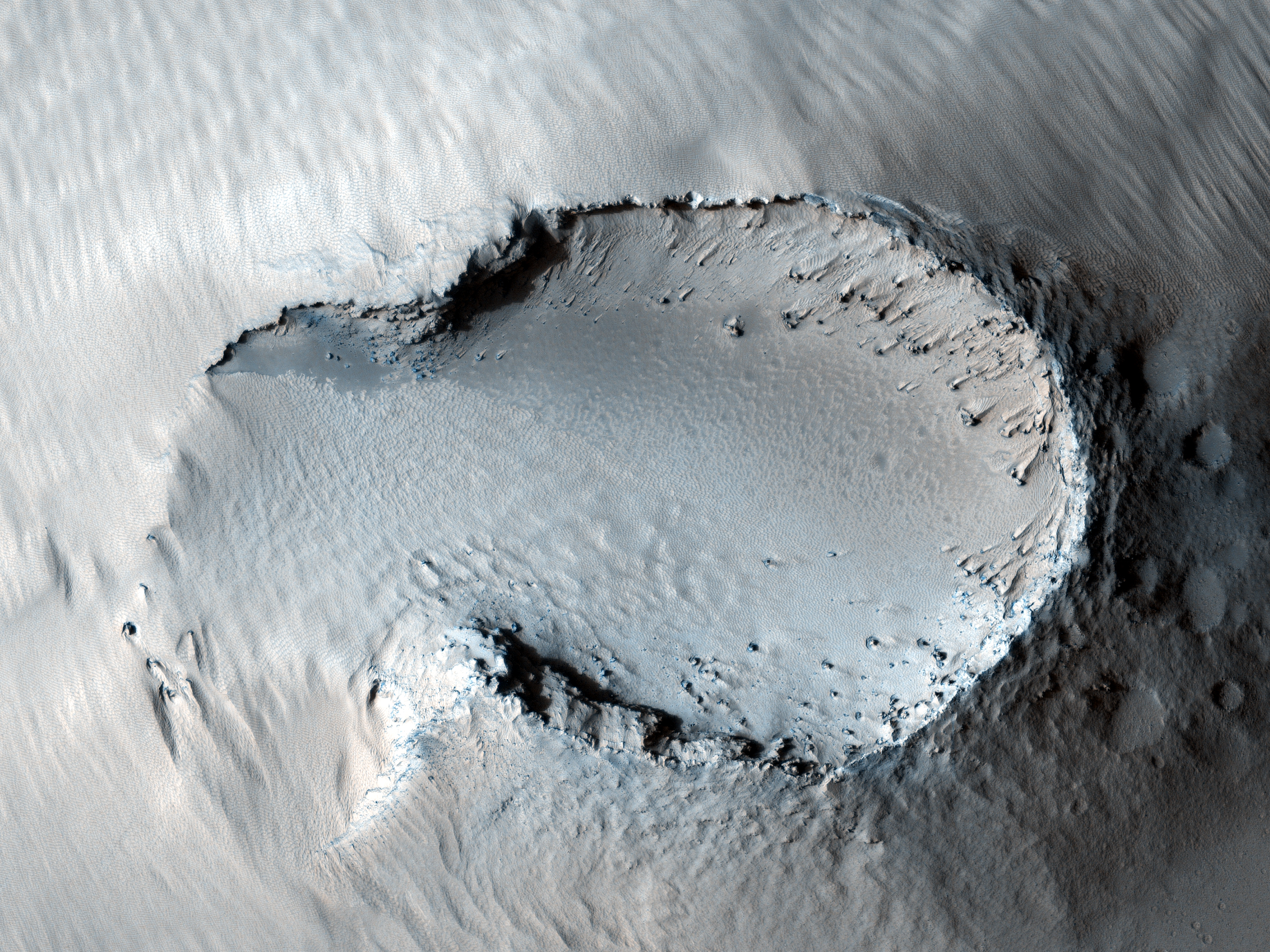
A cinder cone on southern flank of Pavonis Mons.

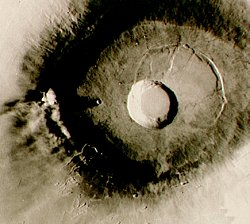
The summit caldera of Pavonis Mons

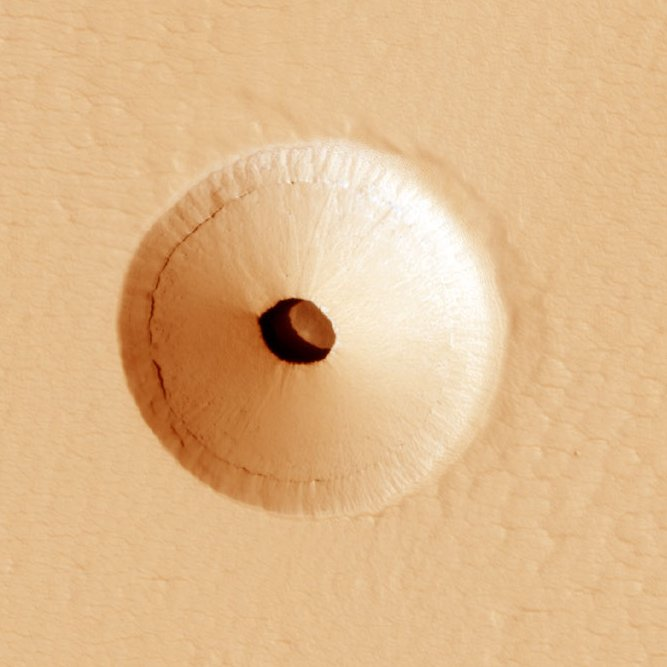
HiRISE image (color) of a 35 m wide lava tube skylight surrounded by a collapse pit on Pavonis Mons

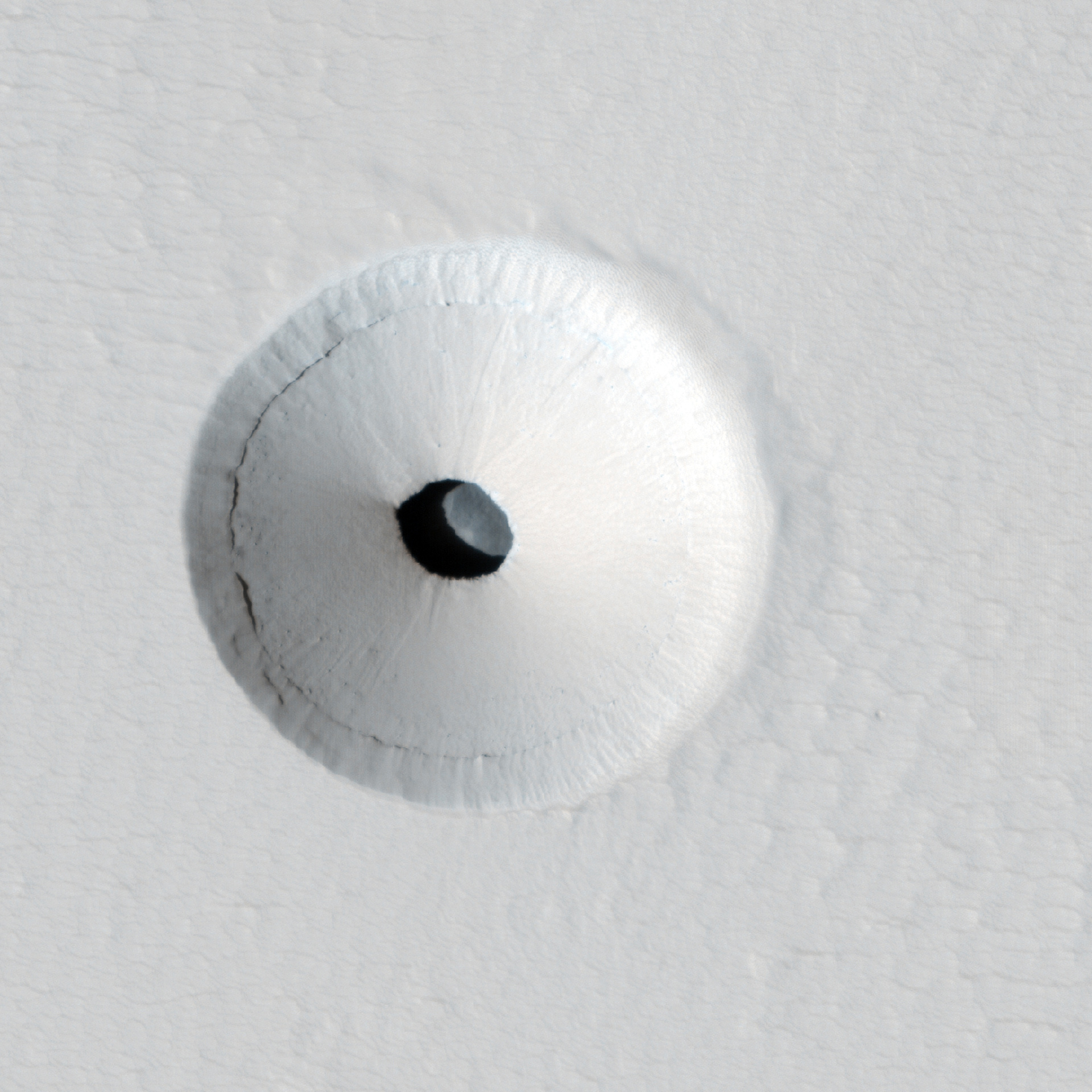
HiRISE image of a 35 m wide lava tube skylight surrounded by a collapse pit on Pavonis Mons

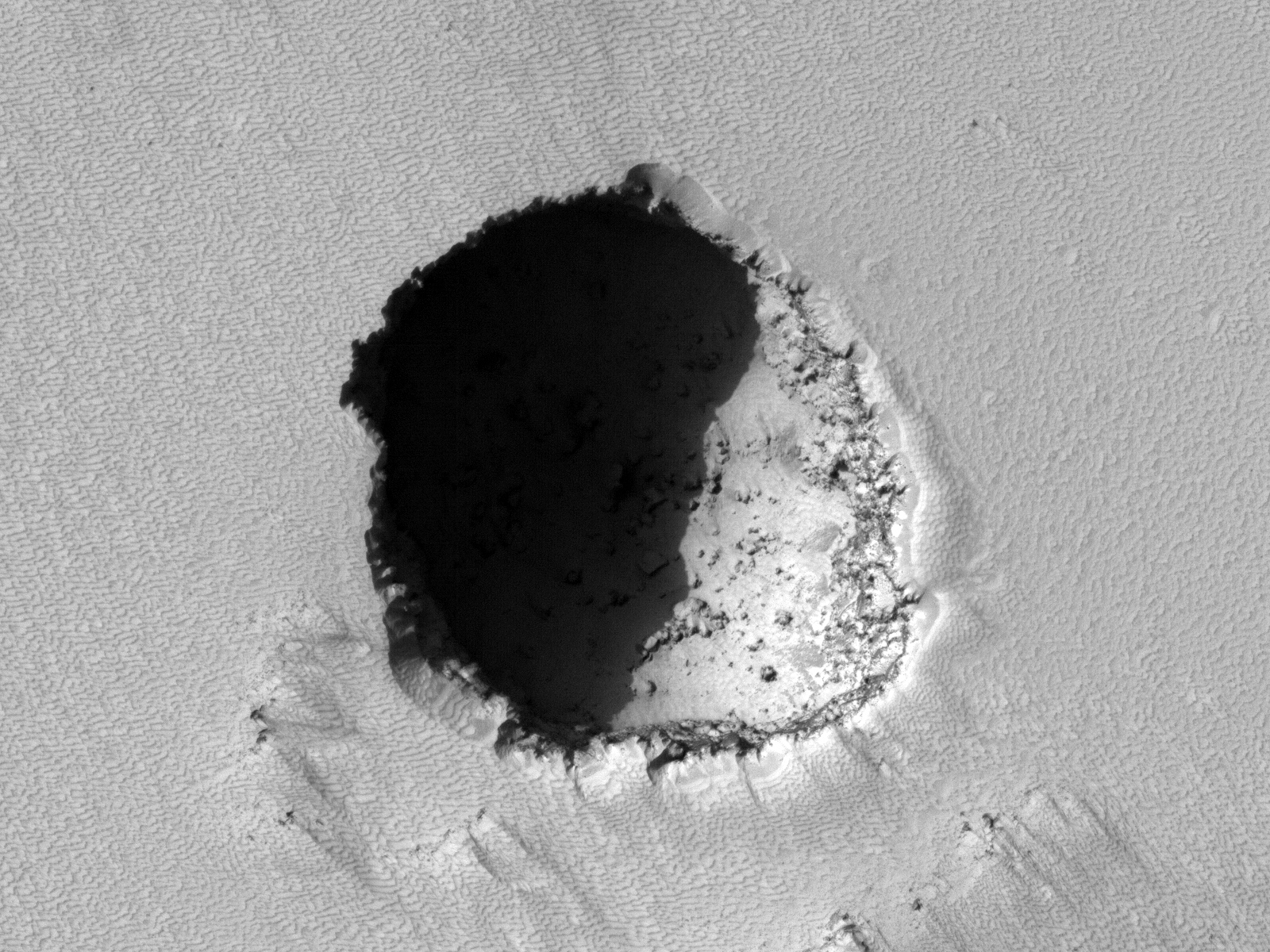
HiRISE image of a 180 m wide lava tube skylight on the volcano's southeast flank

== See also ==
- List of mountains on Mars by height
- Tharsis quadrangle
