= Arsia Mons =

Martian volcano

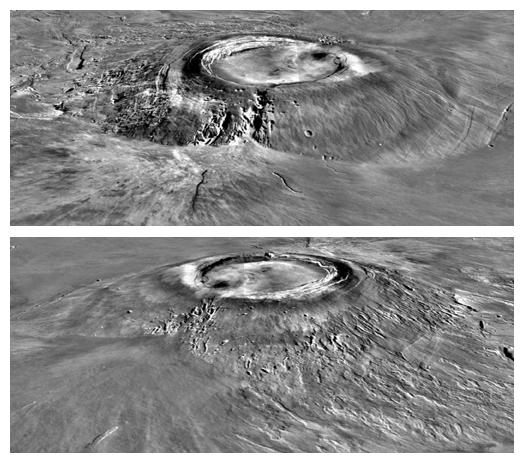
- Viking mosaic/MOLA topography image with 10:1 vertical exaggeration, showing the massive side lobes on the southwest (top) and northeast (bottom) sides of the volcano
- Feature type: Shield volcano
- Coordinates: 8.35°S 120.09°W
- Peak: 11.7 km (7.3 mi) 38,386 ft (11,700 m)
- Eponym: Latin – Arsia Silva – classical albedo feature name

Arsia Mons /ˈɑːrsiə ˈmɒnz/ is the southernmost of three volcanoes (collectively known as Tharsis Montes) on the Tharsis bulge near the equator of the planet Mars. To its north is Pavonis Mons, and north of that is Ascraeus Mons. The tallest volcano in the Solar System, Olympus Mons, is to its northwest. Its name comes from a corresponding albedo feature on a map by Giovanni Schiaparelli, which he named in turn after the legendary Roman forest of Arsia Silva. Historically, it was known as Nodus Gordii ("Gordian knot") before being renamed.

== Structure ==
Arsia Mons is a shield volcano with a relatively low slope and a massive caldera at its summit. The southernmost of the three Tharsis Montes volcanoes, it is the only major Tharsis volcano south of the equator.

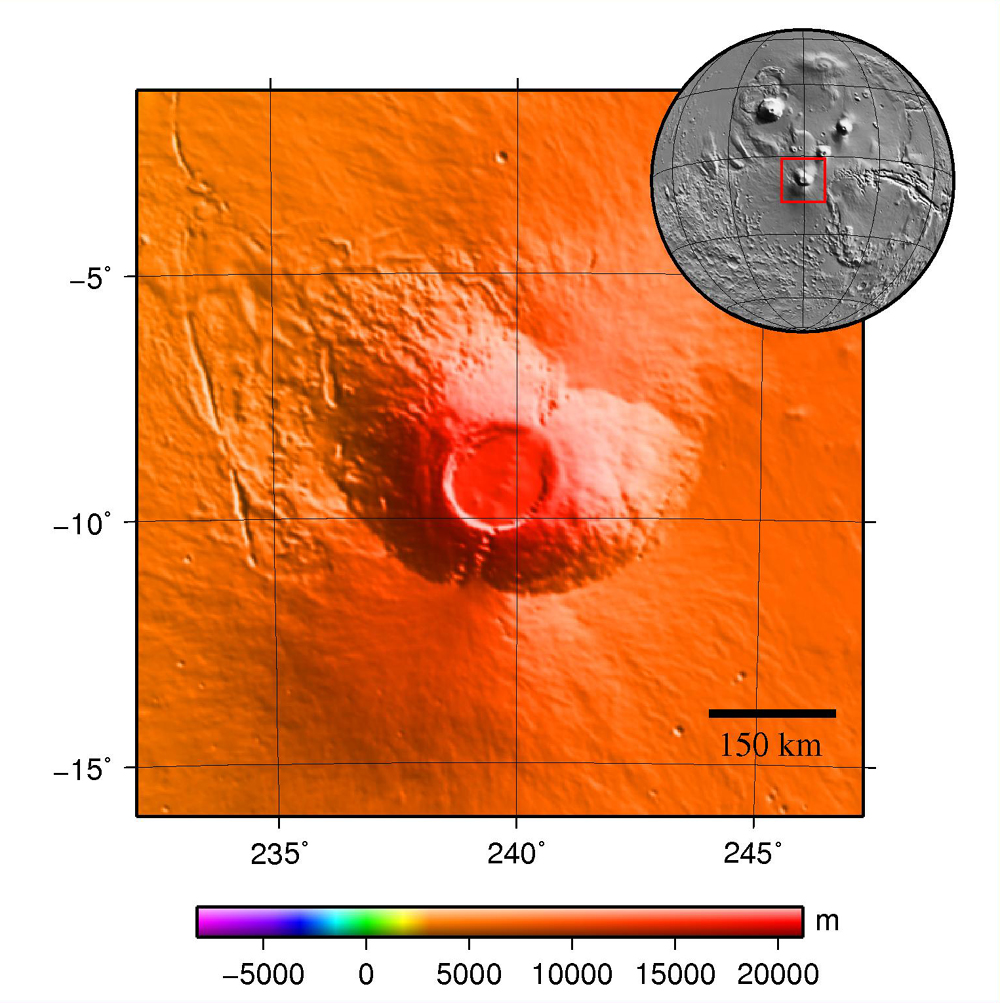
Topographic map of Arsia Mons

The volcano is 435 kilometres (270 mi) in diameter, almost 20 kilometres (12 mi) high (more than 9 kilometers (5.6 mi) higher than the surrounding plains), and the summit caldera is 110 km (72 miles) wide. It experiences atmospheric pressure lower than 107 pascals at the summit. After Olympus Mons, it is the largest known volcano in terms of volume. Arsia Mons has 30 times the volume of Mauna Loa in Hawaii, the largest volcano on the Earth.

The caldera of Arsia Mons was formed when the mountain collapsed in on itself after its reservoir of magma was exhausted. There are many other geologic collapse features on the mountain's flanks. The caldera floor formed around 150 Mya ago.

The shield is transected roughly northeast to southwest by a set of collapse features. The collapse features on the shield are connected by a line of small shield volcanoes on the floor of the caldera. It is possible that this line represents a significant fault similar to others found on the Tharsis bulge. This fault may represent the source of the Arsia lavas.

The rift area to the southwest has been imaged in significant detail by the European Space Agency probe Mars Express. In 2004, a 3D map of this region was created at high resolution. Cliffs, landslides, and numerous collapse features can be seen in this detailed image. Combined with the extensive lava flows at the termination of the rift, this may reveal areas that drained the caldera lavas and contributed to the collapse.

The northwest flank of the volcano is significantly different and rougher than the southeast flank, and the features may represent evidence of glaciers.

== Possible plate tectonics ==
Arsia Mons as visible from day-time THEMIS

The three Tharsis Montes, together with some smaller volcanoes to the north, form a rather straight line. It has been proposed that these are the result of plate tectonics, which on Earth makes chains of "hot spot" volcanoes.

== History ==
The most recent eruptive episode in the history of Arsia Mons, among the youngest on Mars, involved at least 29 vents within the caldera and also eruptions on the flank aprons along the north–south axis of the volcano. This activity is thought to have extended from 200 to 300 Ma to 10–90 Ma ago, peaking at 150 Ma with eruption rates in the caldera of 1–8 km^{3} per Ma. This low recent rate contrasts with an average rate of 270 km^{3}/Ma over the volcano's inferred entire 3400 Ma history.

A study using a global climate model found that the Medusae Fossae Formation could have been formed from ancient volcanic ash from Apollinaris Mons, Arsia Mons, and possibly Pavonis Mons.

== Arsia Mons Elongated Cloud ==
A repeated weather phenomenon occurs each year near the start of southern winter over Arsia Mons. Just before southern winter begins, sunlight warms the air on the slopes of the volcano. On the leeward slope, water ice condenses, forming a cloud – the Arsia Mons Elongated Cloud – which can extend westward for 1800 km. The autumn of 2018 saw a particularly pronounced version of this orographic cloud, as the planet-wide dust storm finally subsided. The presence of some dust undoubtedly emphasised the phenomenon. This phenomenon has been repeatedly observed by the Mars Express orbiter.

== Glaciers ==
Recent work provides evidence for glaciers on Arsia Mons at both high and low elevations. A series of parallel ridges resemble moraines dropped by glaciers. Another section looks as if ice melted under the ground and formed a knobby terrain. The lower part has lobes and seems to be flowing downhill. This lobed feature may still contain an ice core that is covered with a thin layer of rocks that has prevented ice from sublimating.

== Possible cave entrances ==
As of 2007 seven putative cave entrances, have been identified in satellite imagery of the flanks of Arsia Mons. They have been informally dubbed Dena, Chloë, Wendy, Annie, Abbey, Nikki, and Jeanne and resemble "skylights" formed by the collapse of lava tube ceilings.

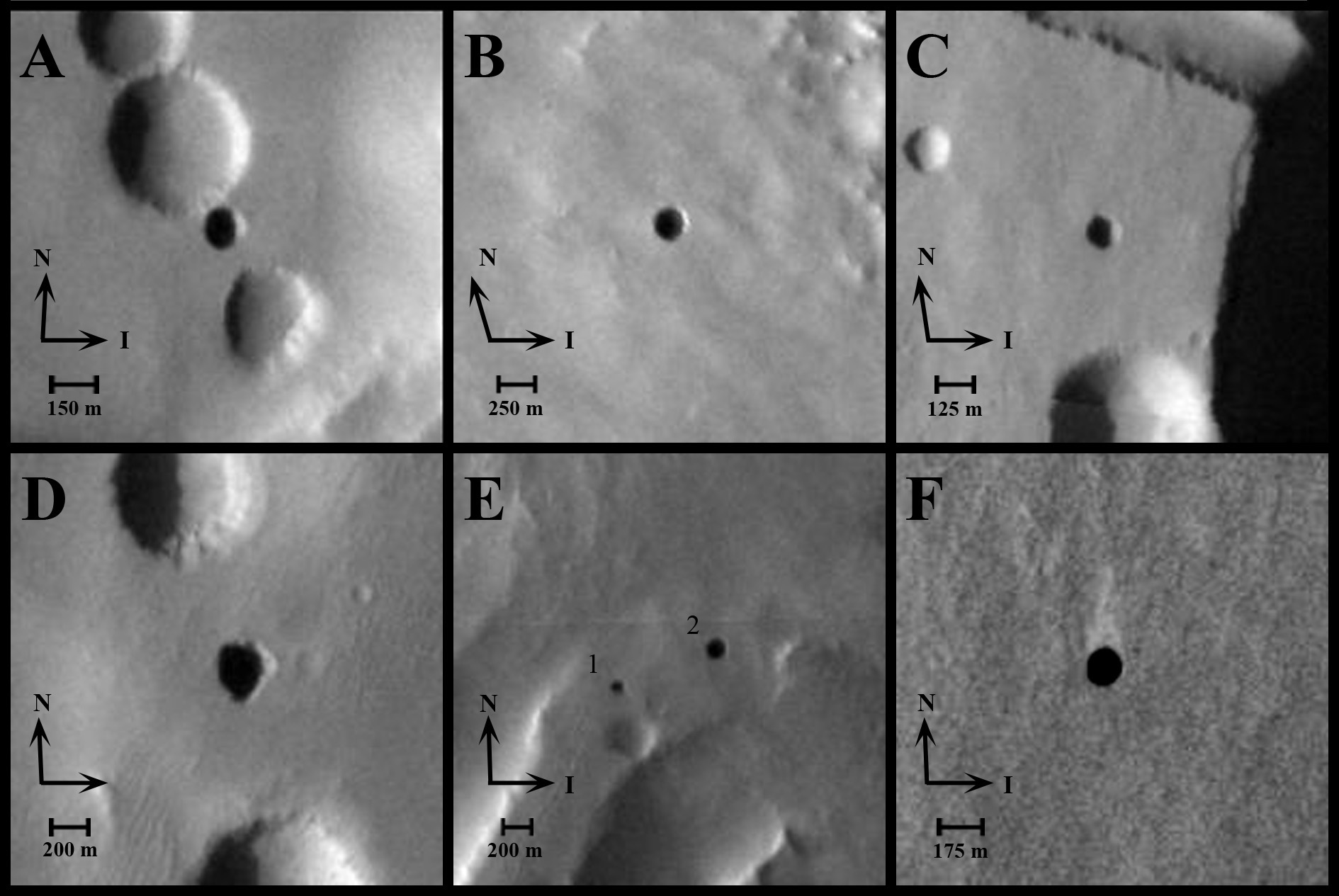
THEMIS image of cave entrances on Mars. The pits have been named (A) Dena, (B) Chloe, (C) Wendy, (D) Annie, (E) Abby (left) and Nikki, and (F) Jeanne.

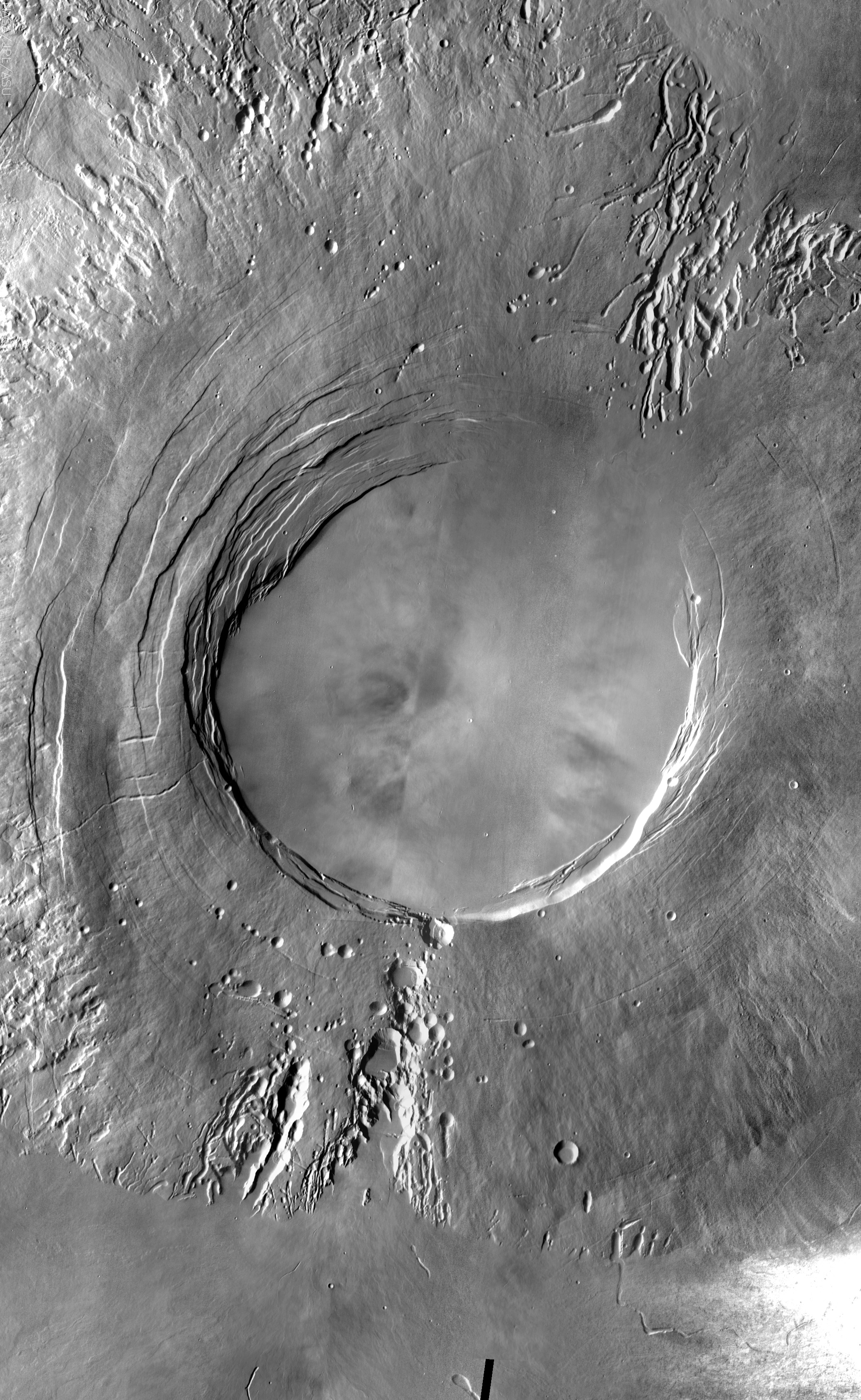
THEMIS image mosaic of Arsia Mons

- Dena (6.084°S 239.061°E)
- Chloë (4.296°S 239.193°E)
- Wendy (8.099°S 240.242°E)
- Annie (6.267°S 240.005°E)
- Abbey and Nikki (8.498°S 240.349°E)
- Jeanne (5.636°S 241.259°E)

From day to night, temperatures of the circular features change only about one-third as much as the change in temperature of surrounding ground. While this is more variable than large caves on Earth, it is consistent with there being deep pits. However, due to the extreme altitude, it is unlikely that they will be able to harbour any form of Martian life.

A more recent photograph of one of the features shows sunlight illuminating a side wall, suggesting that it may simply be a vertical pit rather than an entrance to a larger underground space. Nonetheless, the darkness of this feature implies that it must be at least 178 meters deep.

== Gallery ==
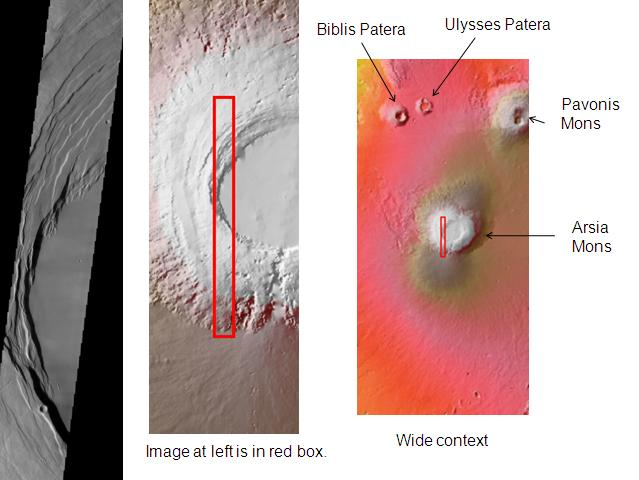
Arsia Mons, as seen by THEMIS. Click on image to see relationship of Arsia Mons to other nearby volcanoes.

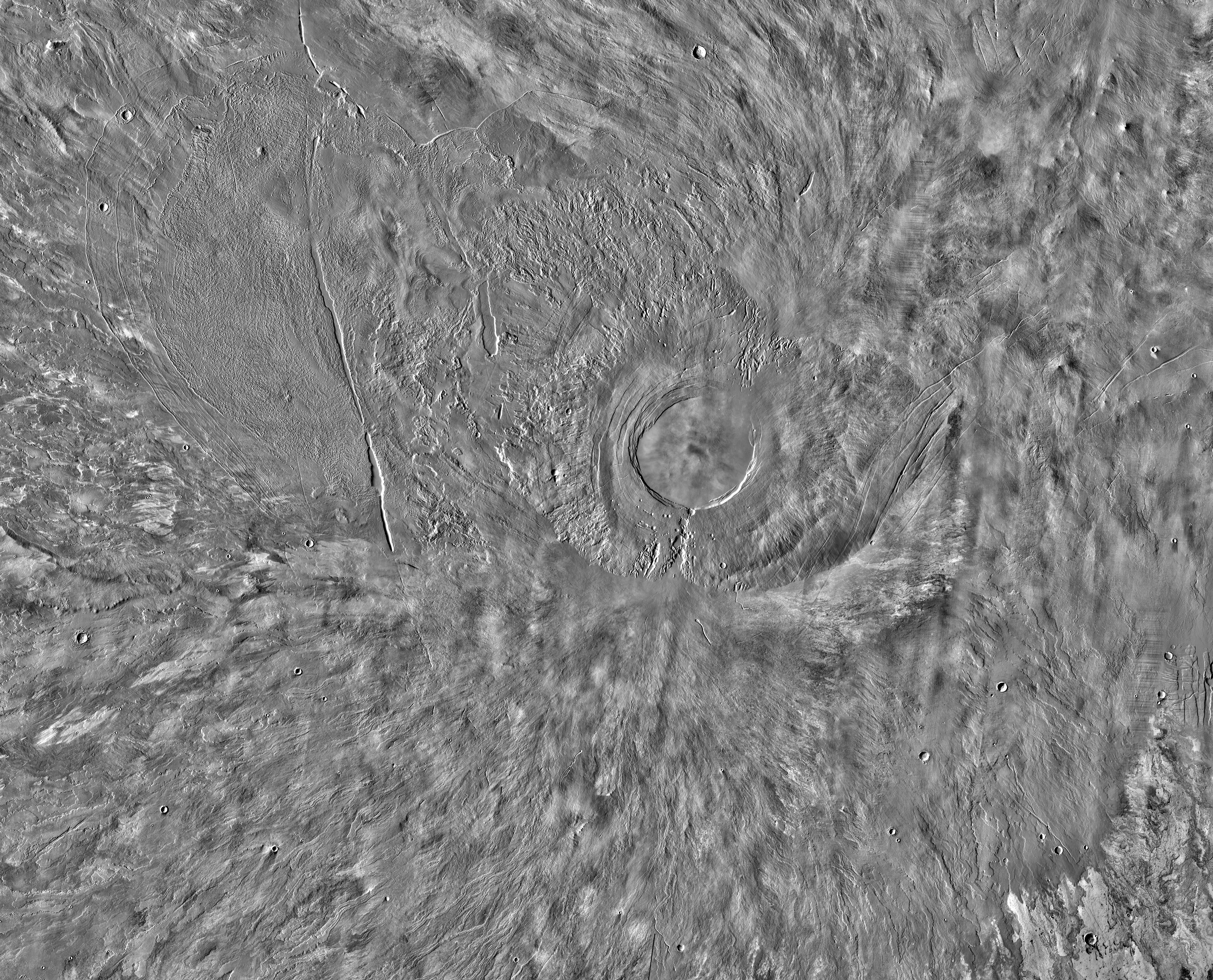
Arsia Mons and its surroundings in a THEMIS daytime infrared image mosaic. A huge fan-shaped expanse of knobby deposits (the Arsia Sulci), believed left by past glaciation, extends northwestward from the mountain.

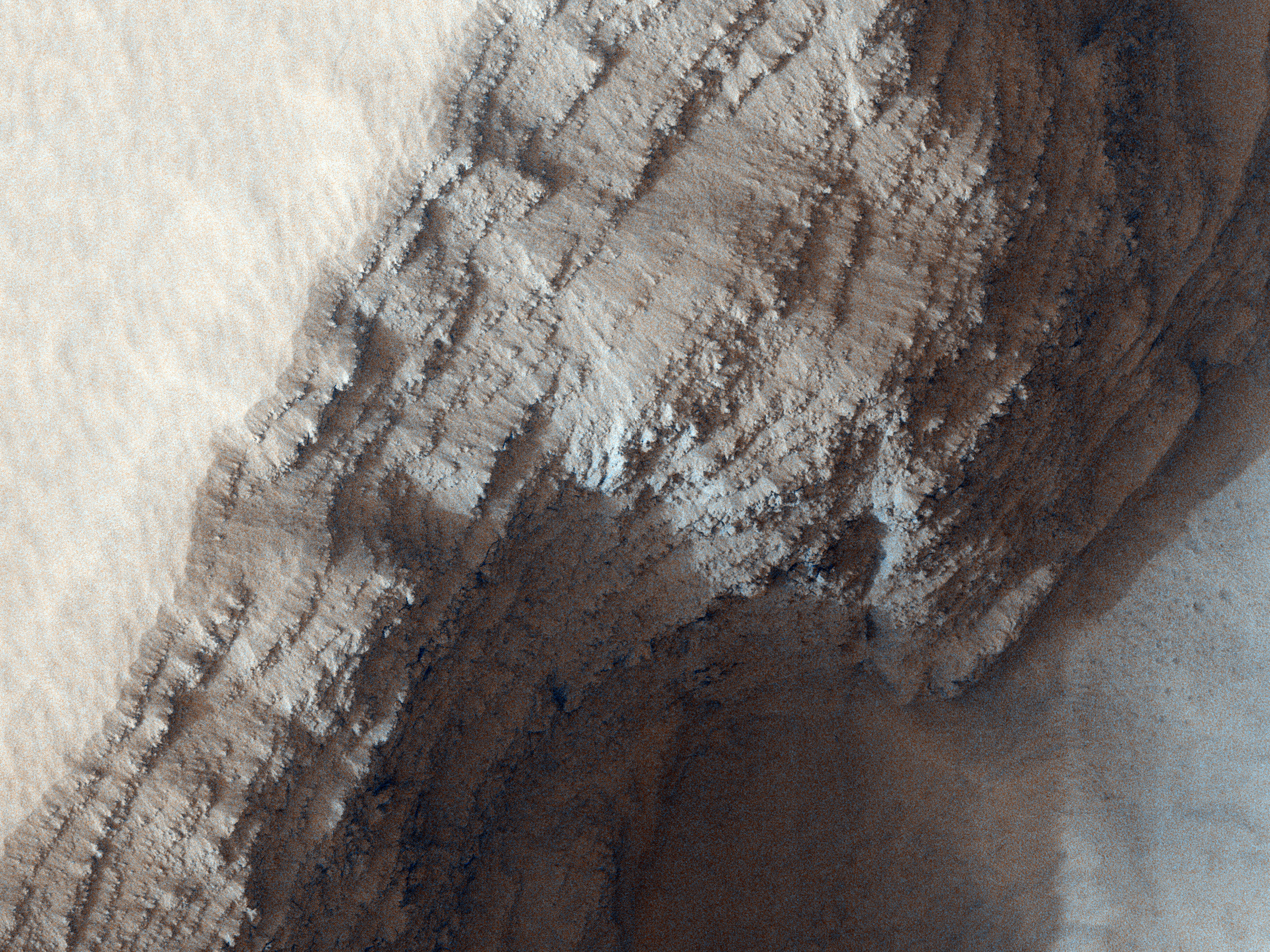
Layers from numerous lava flows are exposed on the side of a pit on the lower west flank of Arsia Mons (photo by HiRISE).

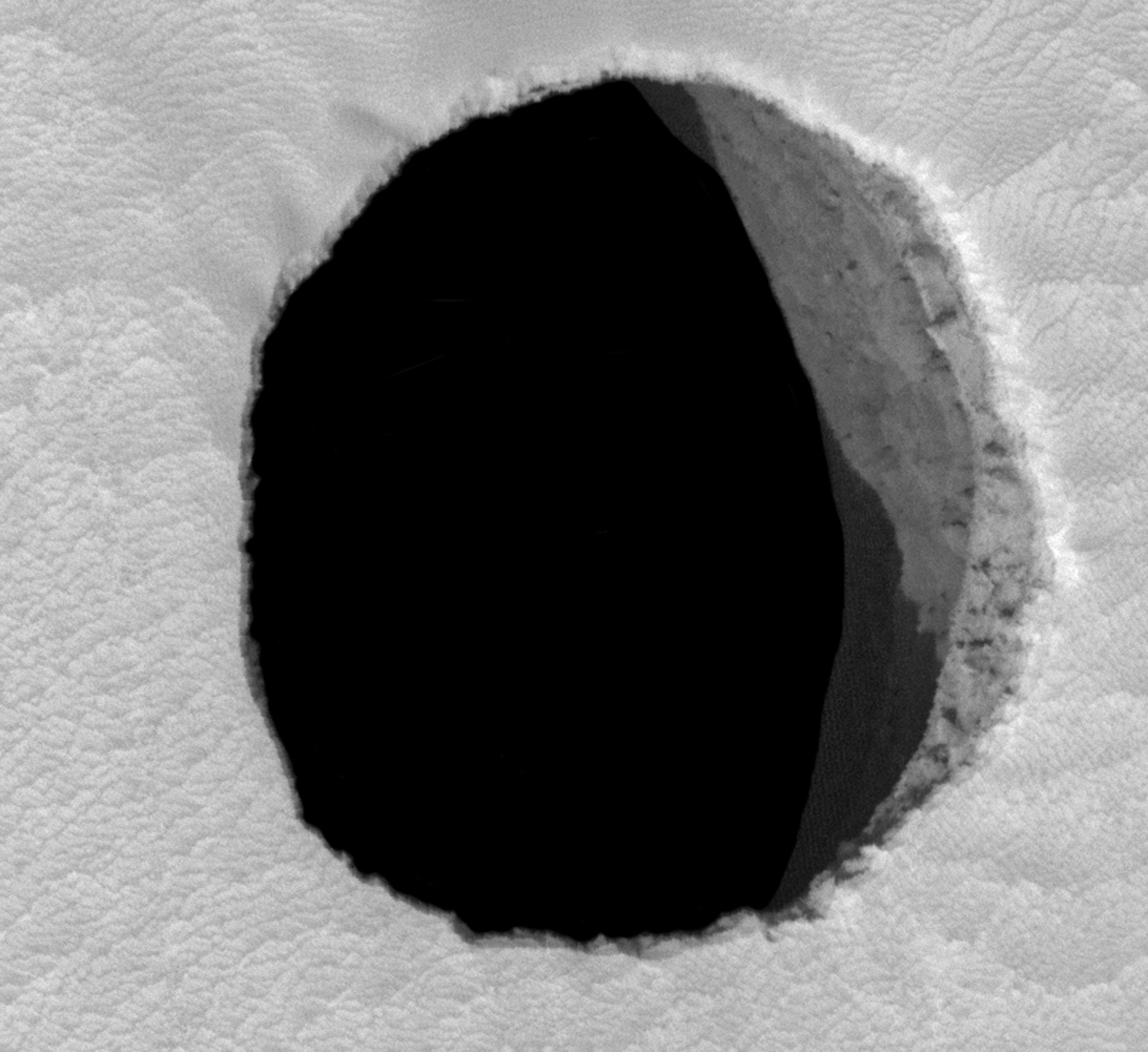
Possible cave entrance ("Jeanne") on Arsia Mons

== See also ==
- Caves of Mars Project
- List of mountains on Mars by height
- List of tallest mountains in the Solar System
- Tharsis quadrangle
