= Thaumasia Planum =

Planum on Mars

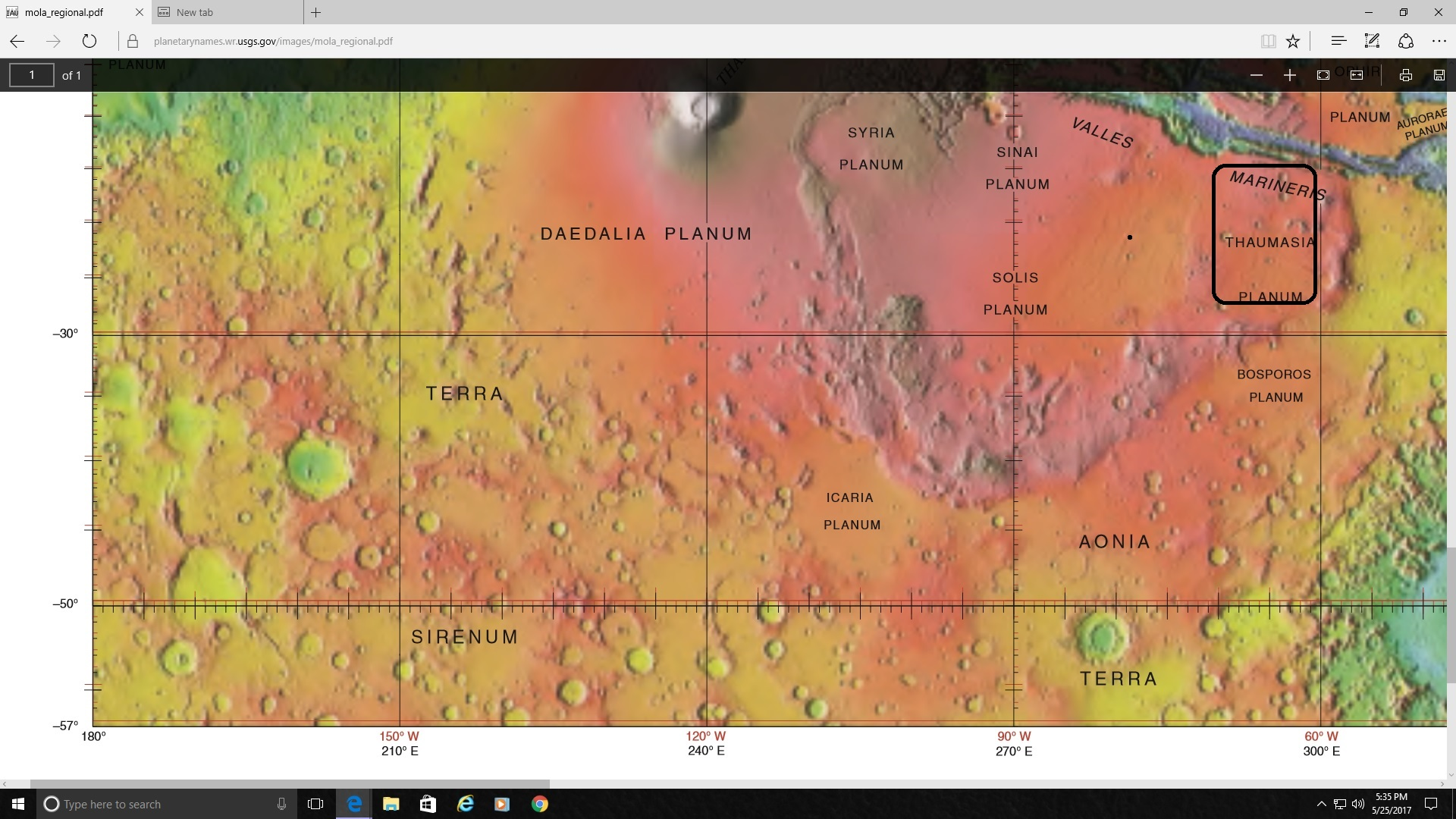
Map showing Thaumasia Planum and surrounding regions. Colors indicate elevations.

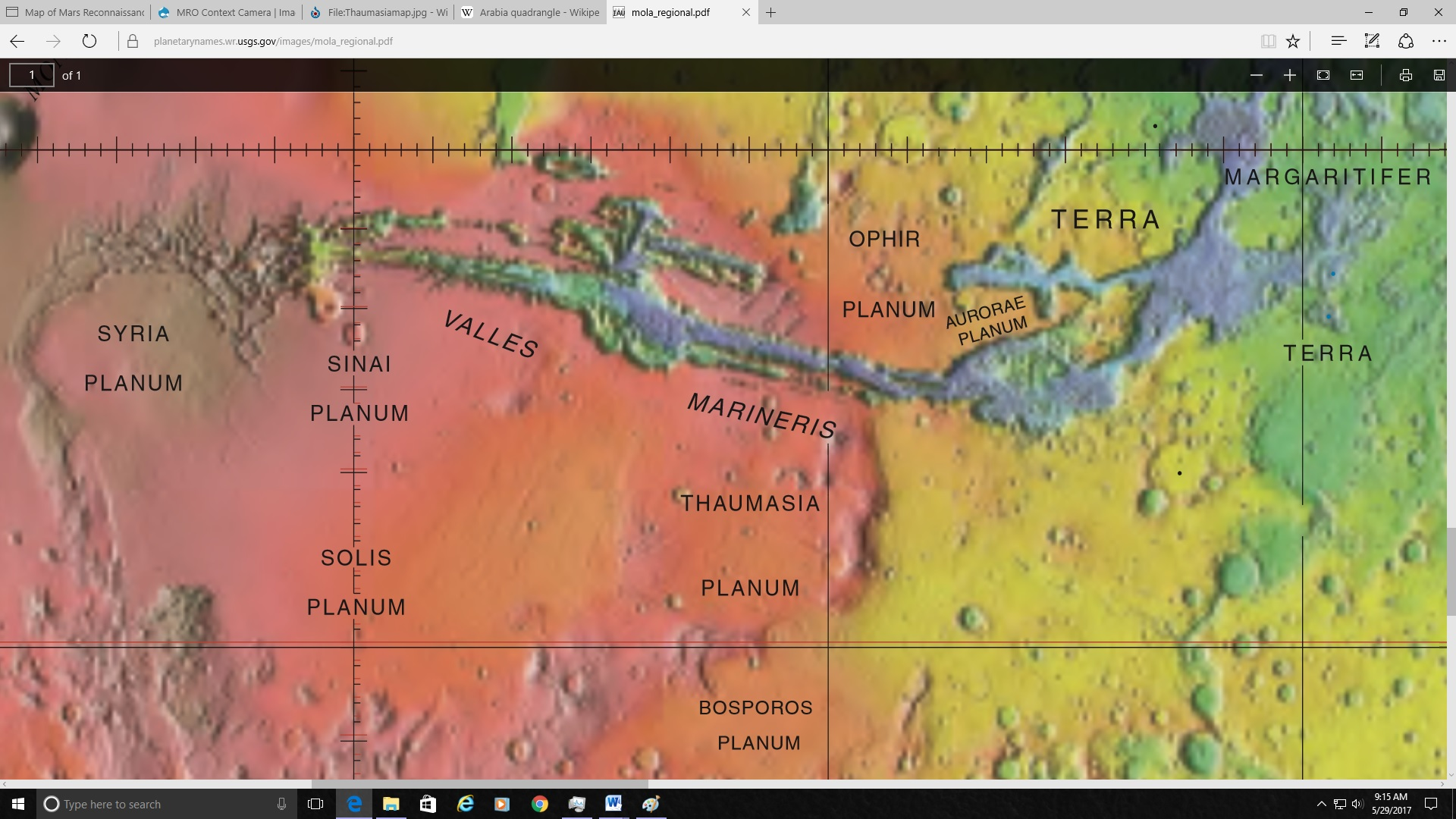
Close map showing Thaumasia Planum and surrounding regions. Colors indicate elevations.

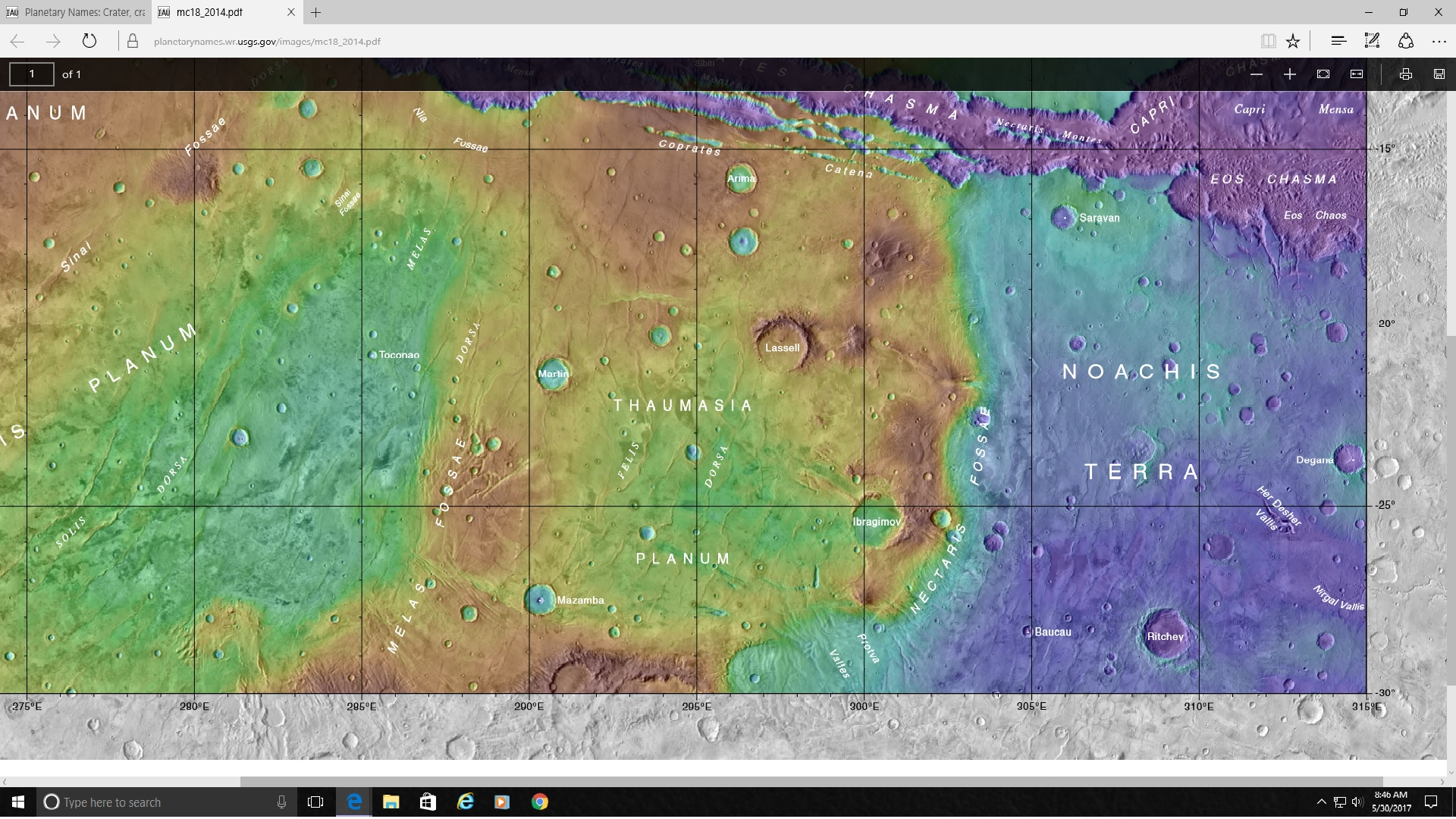
Map of Thaumasia Planum and surrounding region with names of craters.

The Thaumasia Planum of Mars lies south of Melas Chasmata and Coprates Chasmata. It is in the Coprates quadrangle. Its center is located at 21.66 S and 294.78 E. It was named after a classical albedo feature. The name was approved in 2006. Some forms on its surface are evidence of a flow of lava or water the Melas Chasma. Many wrinkle ridges and grabens are visible. One set of grabens, called Nia Fossae, seem to follow the curve of Melas Chasmata which lies just to the north. Some researchers have discovered dikes in this region. For the study, Thermal Emission Imaging System (THEMIS) daytime infrared images, THEMIS nighttime infrared images, CTX images, and HiRISE images were used. These dikes contain magnesium-rich olivine which indicates a primitive magma composition. Dikes occur when magma follows cracks and faults under the ground. Sometimes erosion reveals them. The presence of pit craters, narrow grabens, linear troughs, and ovoid troughs are also evidence of dikes. These dikes that lie close to and parallel to Valles Marineris, the great canyon system, are evidence that extensional stress aided the formation of Valles Marineris. They may be part of a system of dikes that came from the same magma source that fed the whole area. That source may have been a “plume” of molted rock that rose from the Martian mantle.

So, the following events happened to produce the current landscape in Thaumasia Planum.

1. The mass of the volcanoes of Tharsis caused stress that resulted in fractures.

2. Basalt lava flows covered the region. The flows may have come from a system of dikes.

3. Wrinkle ridges formed as a result of regional compression.

4. The final stage was the covering the area with volcanic ash and dust. Wind moved the surface material around.

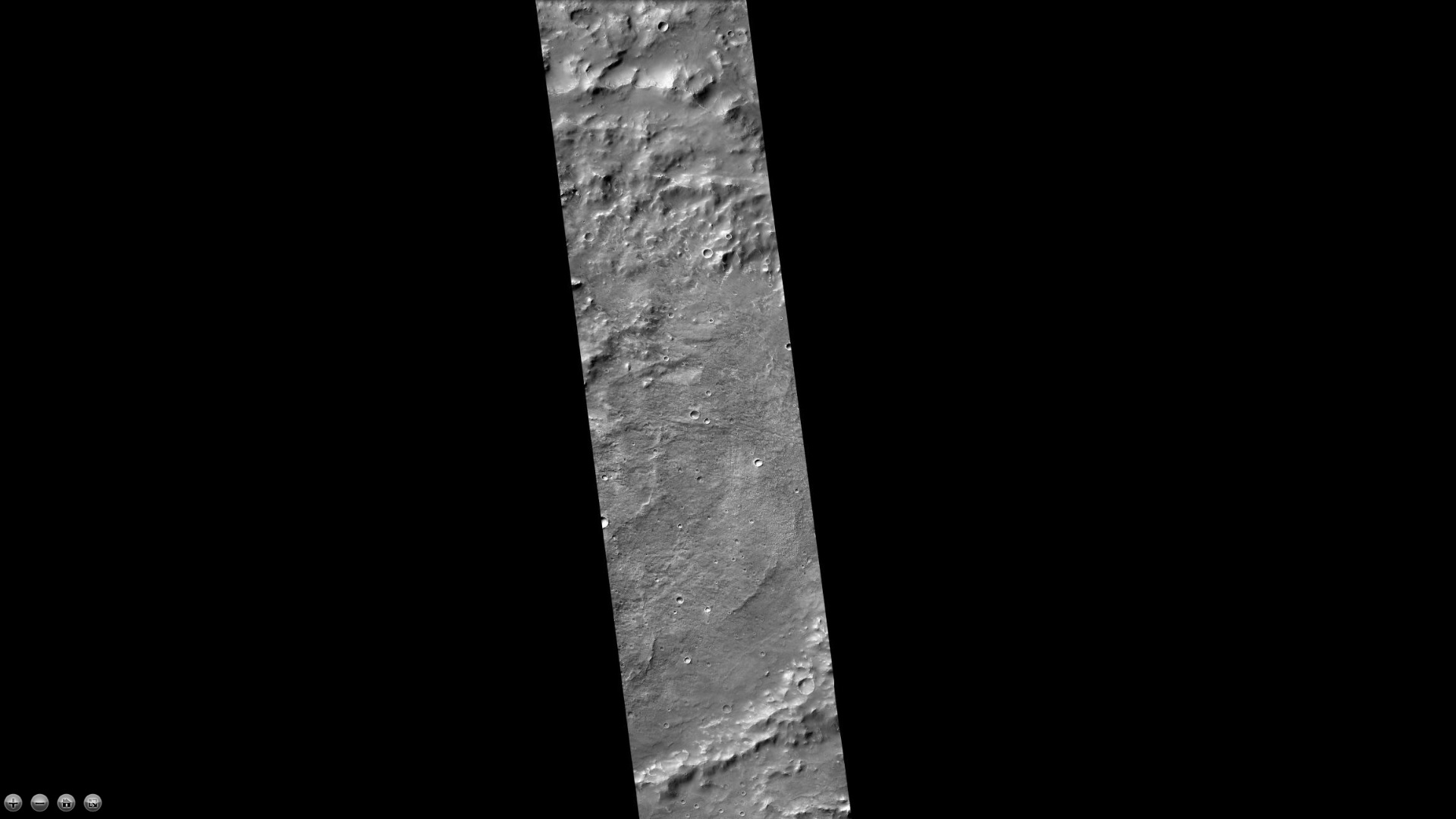
Lassell (Martian crater), as seen by CTX camera (on Mars Reconnaissance Orbiter).

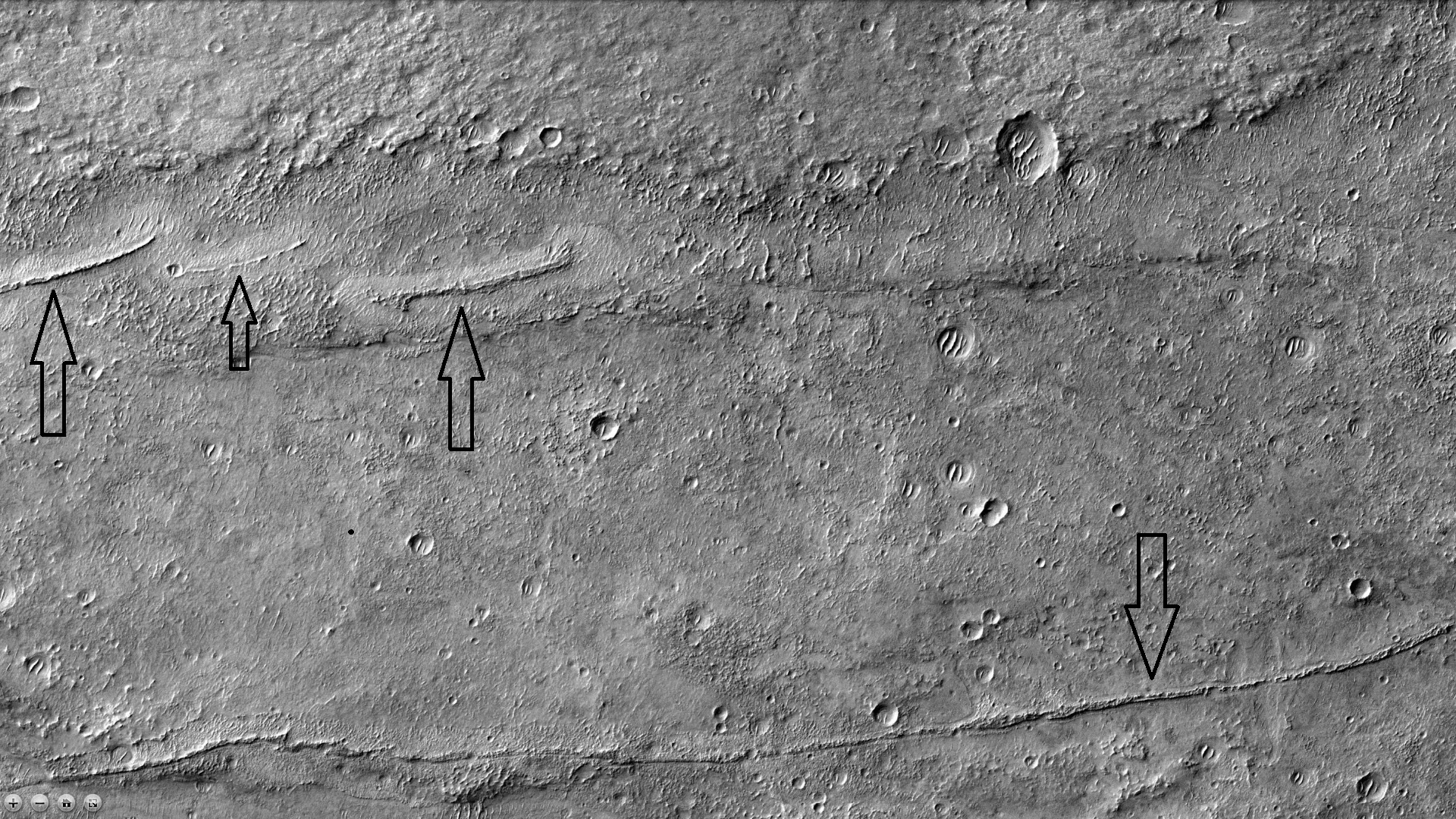
Dikes from when magma rises to near the surface in cracks in rocks. Later erosion may have exposed them

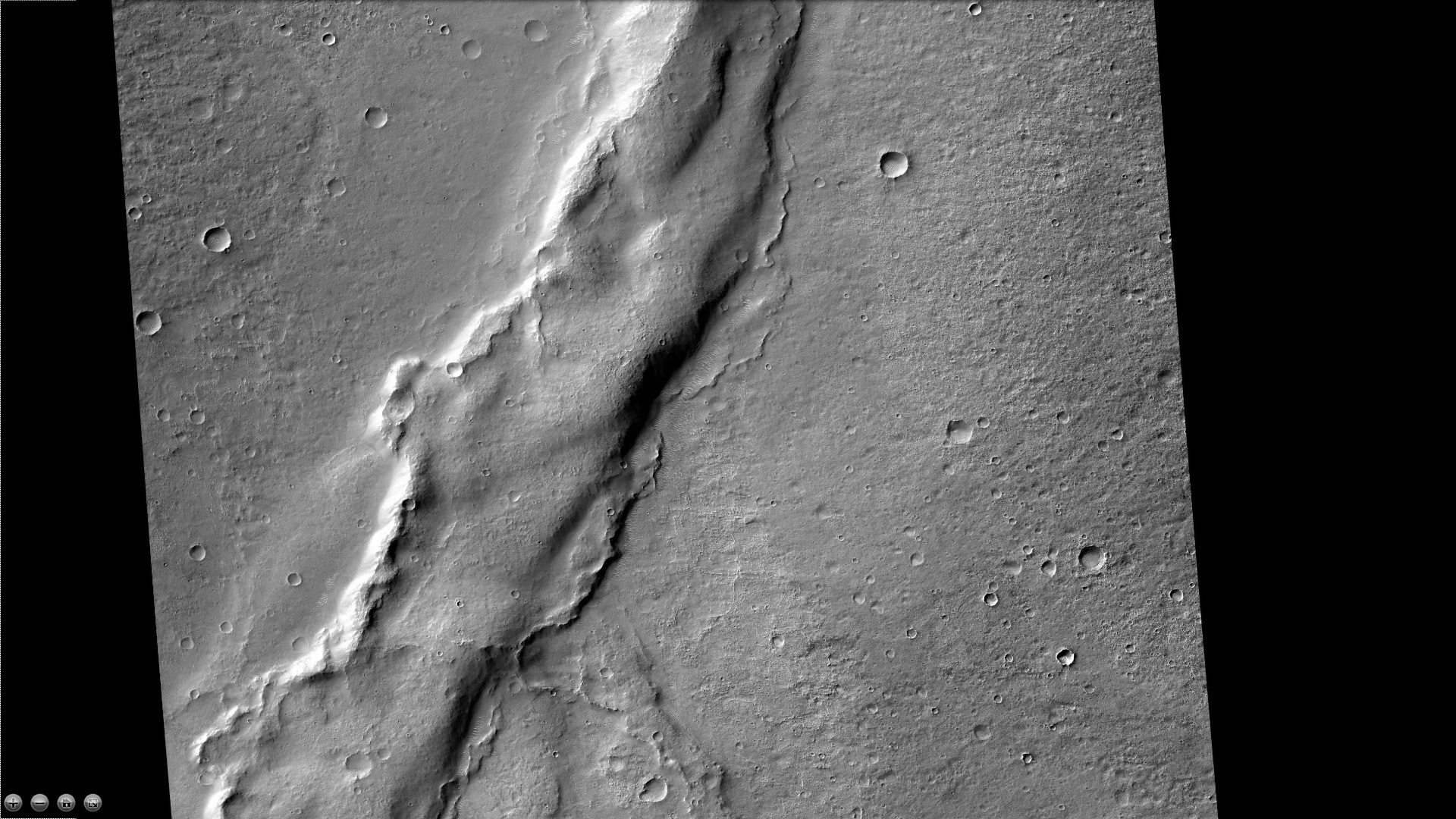
Wrinkle ridges, as seen by CTX

== See also ==
- List of plains on Mars
- Geology of Mars
