= Hebes Mensa =

Mensa on Mars

- Hebes Chasma, seen on daytime IR THEMIS. Hebes Mensa is the feature in the center of the chasm.
- Location: Hebes Chasma (Valles Marineris); Coprates quadrangle
- Coordinates: 1.02°S 76.78°E
- Naming: classical albedo feature

Hebes Mensa is a large mensa that rises from the floor of Hebes Chasma, one of the chasmata of the Valles Marineris network on Mars. Some researchers have identified this mesa to be an interior layered deposit (ILD), similar to Ganges Mensa, and are named for alternating light-toned and dark-toned layers forming a stair-stepped stratigraphy. The faces of Hebes Mensa are sometimes fluted. It is 7.5 kilometres (4.7 mi) tall and 120 by 43 kilometres (75 by 27 mi) wide.

== Observation history ==
Hebes Mensa was first named in 1982.

== Context ==
Hebes Mensa is located within the Hebes Chasma of Valles Marineris, within the Coprates quadrangle. To its east is Juventae Dorsa and the larger Lunae Planum, and to its south is Perrotin Crater and the main body of Valles Marineris (specifically Ophir Chasma). To its west are Tithoniae Fossae and Echus Chasma, the latter of which continues north of Hebes Mensa into the Lunae Palus quadrangle. Also to the north is Echus Fossae. As Hebes Mensa is part of Valles Marineris, many features which are common throughout Valles Marineris are common at Hebes Mesa. For example, many recurring slope linneae (dark, thin, seasonal features thought to be caused by modern running water) occur at Hebes Mensa.

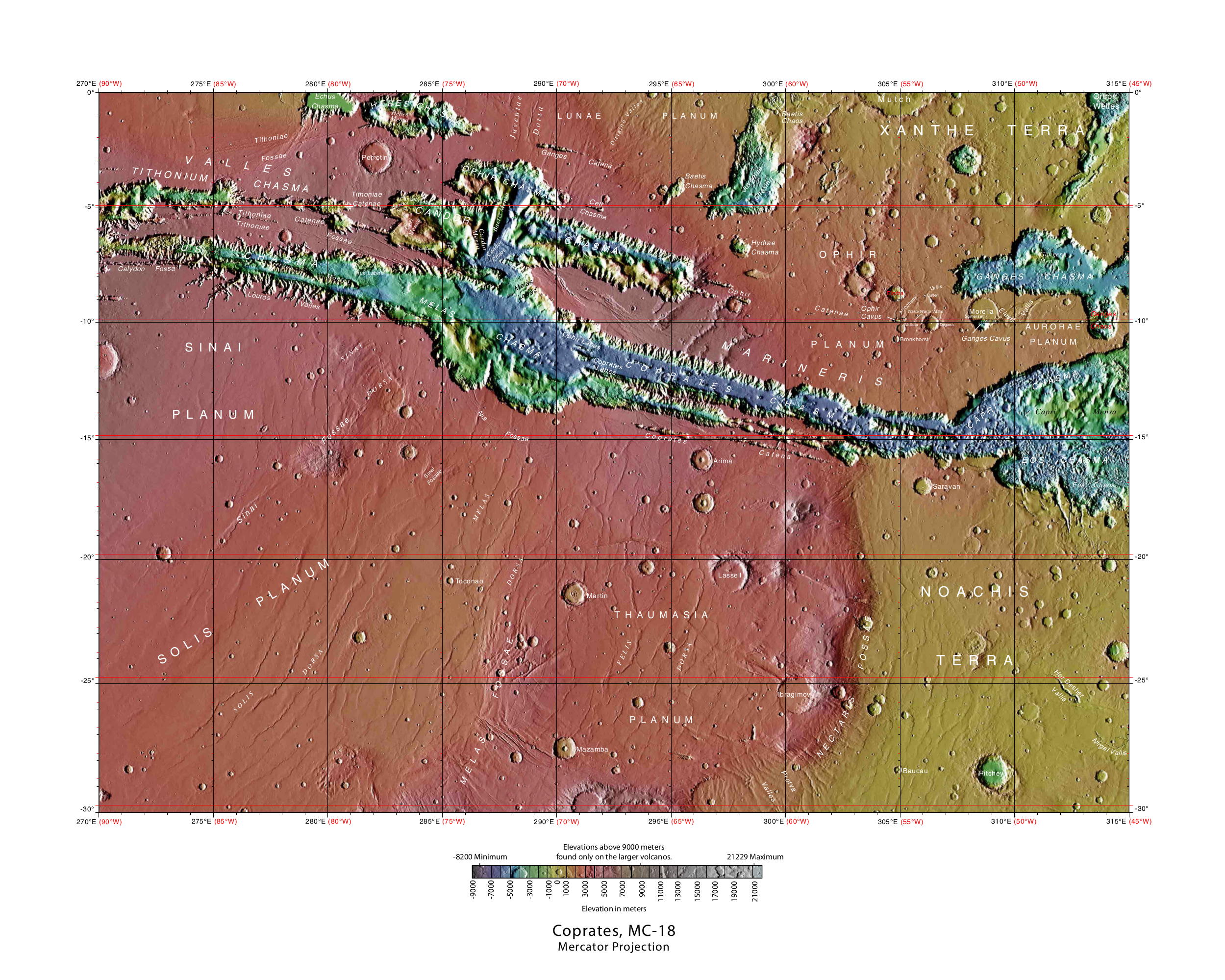
The Coprates quadrangle, Hebes Mensa can be seen in the far north of the quadrangle, just west of the horizontal center.

== Formation theories ==
Many researchers have proposed a low-energy lacustrine depositional origin tied to continual groundwater feeding interspersed with occasional subaqueous volcanism. Others have contested this hypothesis, noting that Hebes Mensa is so tall that it actually stretches above the canyon walls of Hebes Chasma. Such researchers propose that Hebes Mensa is actually a tuya, modeled on ones observed in Russia's Azas Plateau and in northern Iceland, which are volcanic edifices that form due to the effects of subglacial volcanism.

Another theory of the mensa’s origin ties it to the growth of its surrounding chasm; the chasm was filled by sediments, but then later grew, creating a valley between the original sediment fillings and the chasm walls. The sediments would have arrived there via either a pyroclastic (lava-related) or aeolian (wind-related) process. It has also been suggested that Hebes Mensa is a salt dome. In this theory, 3 kilometres (1.9 mi) deep subsurface brine pools were heated up from below, causing the salt to separate from the water and displace the regolith above. This method of formation would also explain some aspects of Hebes Chasma formation as well. A terrestrial analogue would be Conrad and Thetis Deep at the Red Sea.

== Geology ==
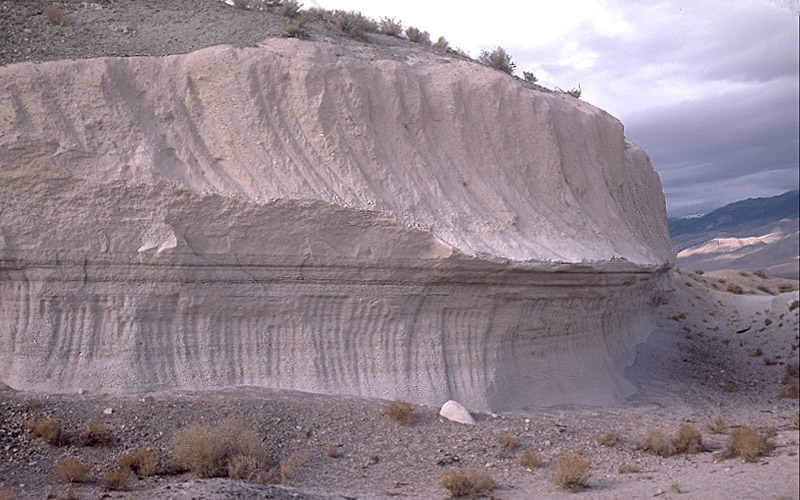
Hebes Mensa’s geology has been compared to Bishop Tuff, California.

Hebes Mensa is estimated to be the same age as other interior layered deposits in Mars, dating back to the Hesperian period of Mars’ history. It can be split into at least three geological units, the Lower, Upper, and Late interior layered deposit units (ILDs). The Lower and Upper ILDs make up the bulk of the mensa, whereas the Late ILD is located in the valley between Hebes Mensa and the northern wall of the surrounding chasm. The Lower ILD underwent shallow folding. All layers are believed to have been shaped by past glacial activity, and ash falls are thought to have played an important role as well.

The Lower ILD encompasses the materials at elevations from −3.7 to −1.4 kilometres (−2.30 to −0.87 mi), and the Upper ILD ranges from −1.4 to 3.8 kilometres (−0.87 to 2.36 mi). The Upper ILD has regions both light and dark in tone, although in general it is lighter than the Lower ILD. Yardangs are found in the Upper ILD. The Late ILD ranges over an area of 700 square kilometres (270 sq mi), and can be found in elevations ranging from −2.8 to −0.1 kilometres (−1.740 to −0.062 mi). It contains hummocks and polygons, which are not typically found in the other units. The Late ILD only partially overlaps Hebes Mensa proper, although what remains is completely contained in Hebes Chasma.

There have been at least 4 major landslides from the mesa. These past landslides have left scars, exposing the insides of the feature that are similar in composition to the outer layers. This lends confidence to deductions that have been made using outer layer geology. One such deduction is based on the presence of both mono- and poly-hydrated sulfates (with a transition between the two occurring between elevations 800 and 900 metres (2,600 and 3,000 ft)); their thorough presence implies that the mensa could have been saturated with water at the time of its formation.

The central mound has a shallow slope of only 3°. The northern slopes have an average incline of 17°, whereas the southern slops are steeper, with an average incline of 27°. The northern side has undergone more erosion, and yardangs are more prevalent there. In the northeast, there are many wrinkle ridges, and to the west are many parallel faults. There are not many faults in the southern plateau.
