= List of chasmata on Mars =

What follows is a list of chasmata on Mars. A chasma is a deep, steep sided, elongated depression similar to a canyon on Earth.

Name	Coordinates	Notes
Arsia Chasmata	7.5°S 119.4°W	
Ascraeus Chasmata	8.7°N 105.7°W	
Australe Sulci	84.9°S 135°E	Part of Planum Australe
Baetis Chasma	4.3°S 65°W	
Candor Chasma	6.5°S 70.9°W	Part of Valles Marineris
Capri Chasma	9.8°S 43.3°W	
Ceti Chasma	5°S 68.4°W	
Chasma Australe	82.2°S 94.4°E	Part of Planum Australe
Chasma Boreale	82.9°N 47.1°W	
Coprates Chasma	13.2°S 61.4°W	Part of Valles Marineris
Echus Chasma	2.6°N 80.1°W	
Elysium Chasma	22.3°N 141.5°E	
Eos Chasma	12°S 39.7°W	Part of Valles Marineris
Ganges Chasma	7.9°S 48.1°W	Part of Valles Marineris
Hebes Chasma	1.1°S 76.2°W	
Hellas Chasma	34.6°S 294.5°W	
Hyblaeus Chasma	22°N 141.2°E	
Hydrae Chasma	6.8°S 62.0°W	
Ius Chasma	6.9°S 85.8°W	Part of Valles Marineris
Juventae Chasma	3.5°S 61.4°W	
Melas Chasma	10.3°S 72.7°W	Part of Valles Marineris
Ophir Chasma	4°S 72.5°W	Part of Valles Marineris
Pavonis Chasma	2.7°N 111.2°W	
Promethei Chasma	82.2°S 141.5°E	Part of Planum Australe
Tithonium Chasma	4.6°S 84.7°W	Part of Valles Marineris
Ultimum Chasma	81.2°S 151.1°E	Part of Planum Australe

== See also ==
- List of Valles on Mars
