= Flute (disambiguation) =

A flute is a musical instrument.

Flute can also refer to:

== People ==
- Sébastien Flute (born 1972), French archer

== Arts, entertainment, and media ==
- "Flute" (song), a song by New World Sound and Thomas Newson
- Francis Flute, a Shakespearean character
- Bansuri: The Flute, a 2021 Indian film

== Other uses ==
- Flute (cutting tool), the grooves on a drill bit
- Flute (geology), a primary sedimentary structure
- Flute (glacial), a glacial landform
- Flute, the secondary of a two-stage thermonuclear weapon
- Champagne flute, stemware used to drink champagne
- En flûte, a French naval expression
- Flûte (ship), a French ship type
- Flute Summit (British Columbia), Canada
- Flûte, a type of baguette bread
- Flute, a type of flue pipe in organs

== See also ==
- Fluting (disambiguation)
