= Ganges Mensa =

Mensa in the Coprates quadrangle of Mars

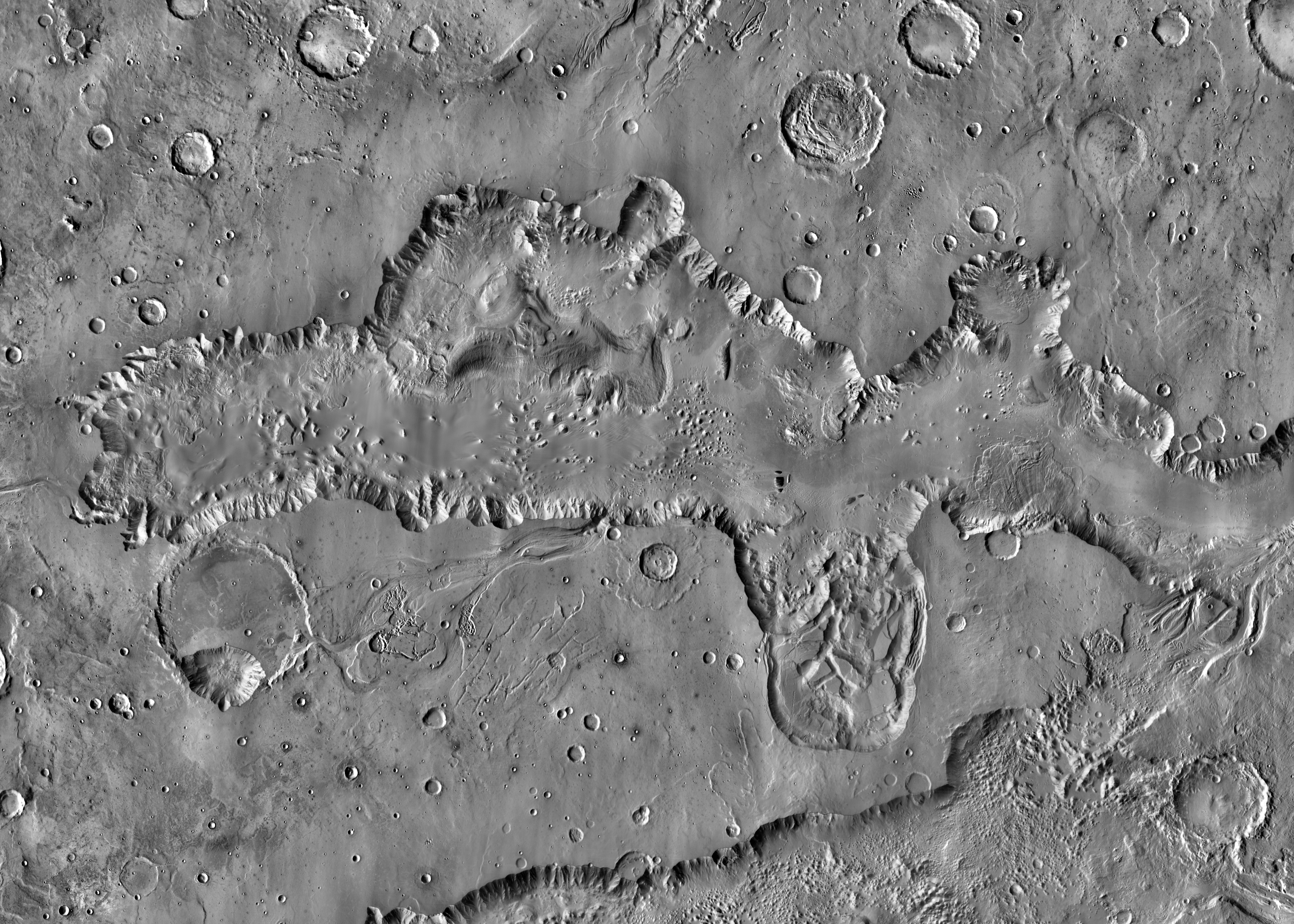
- A THEMIS infrared image of Ganges Chasma. North is up. Ganges Mensa is the prominent mountain-like feature near the center of the image.
- Location: Ganges Chasma (Valles Marineris); Coprates quadrangle
- Coordinates: 7.2°S 48.8°W
- Naming: Classical albedo feature

Ganges Mensa (also occasionally termed Gangis Mensa in literature) is a mesa and an interior layered deposit in Ganges Chasma, one of the peripheral valleys of Valles Marineris on Mars. The mesa rises up to 4 kilometres (13,000 ft) from the floor of Ganges Chasma, nearly to the same elevation as the surrounding plateaux of Lunae Planum. Like Hebes Mensa, the mesa is completely separated from the surrounding canyon walls and has sustained significant erosion that has caused it to retreat in areal extent.

The mesa is composed of friable, thinly-layered units which decompose into fluted patternations, interpreted by most researchers as erosional aeolian features known as yardangs. It is capped by a more resistant layer that is interpreted by many researchers to be volcanic in origin. Although the mesa is understood to have formed through some combination of volcanism and sedimentary deposition, there is ongoing contention over whether the volcanism associated with the mesa occurred subglacially (into an ice megalaccolith) or subaqueously (into a paleolake). Those who favor the subglacial hypothesis believe that Ganges Mensa is a tuya that is extremely similar to analogues observed in the Azas Plateau of Tuva, Russia.

== Context ==
Ganges Mensa is a mesa that sits in a deep upstream basin of the peripheral Ganges Chasma arm of the Valles Marineris valley network. It stretches for nearly 100 kilometres (60 mi) from east to west and 50 kilometres (30 mi) to the north and south between the walls of Ganges Chasma, bounded to the north by a sharp escarpment and gradually tapering towards the valley floor on the south. At its peak, the mesa rises up to 4 kilometres (13,000 ft) from the Ganges Chasma floor, and its profile has an average elevation of 2 kilometres (6,600 ft) from the valley floor. Ganges Mensa and Hebes Mensa are the only mesas of Valles Marineris that extend to the height of the surrounding plateau terrain. The mesa is separated from the canyon walls to the north by a moat-like stretch of valley floor, similar to Hebes and Capri Mensae and many of the mesa structures observed within Valles Marineris. Some researchers have interpreted Ganges Mensa to overlay chaos terrains in upstream Ganges Chasma.

The mesa is surrounded by the most extensive and densely-concentrated dune sea on Mars outside the polar regions of the planet. A broad sandy plain stretches out to the south of the mesa and is interspersed with knobby plains and smaller mesas up to 20 kilometres (12 mi) across in size, gradually decreasing in size to the east. This region has been interpreted as a chaos terrain or a mantled, eroded remnant of volcanic edifices. The moat-like region to the north of the mesa province is dominated by landslide terrains from collapses in the Ganges Chasma canyon wall. Some of this area has since been mantled by sand dune cover.

Researchers have also reported evidence for sulfate signatures manifesting in light-toned mounds that can be observed across the Ganges Chasma floor. Some researchers have interpreted these landforms as originating in the erosion of sulfate-bearing layers present within units of Ganges Mensa.

Ganges Mensa is in the Coprates quadrangle of Mars, centered near the equator in the western hemisphere at 7.2° S and 48.8° W. The landform was named after a classical albedo feature that was published in a 1930 manuscript called La Planéte Mars authored by the French-Greek astronomer Eugène Michel Antoniadi. The International Astronomical Union officially approved Ganges Mensa's name in 2006.

== Geology ==
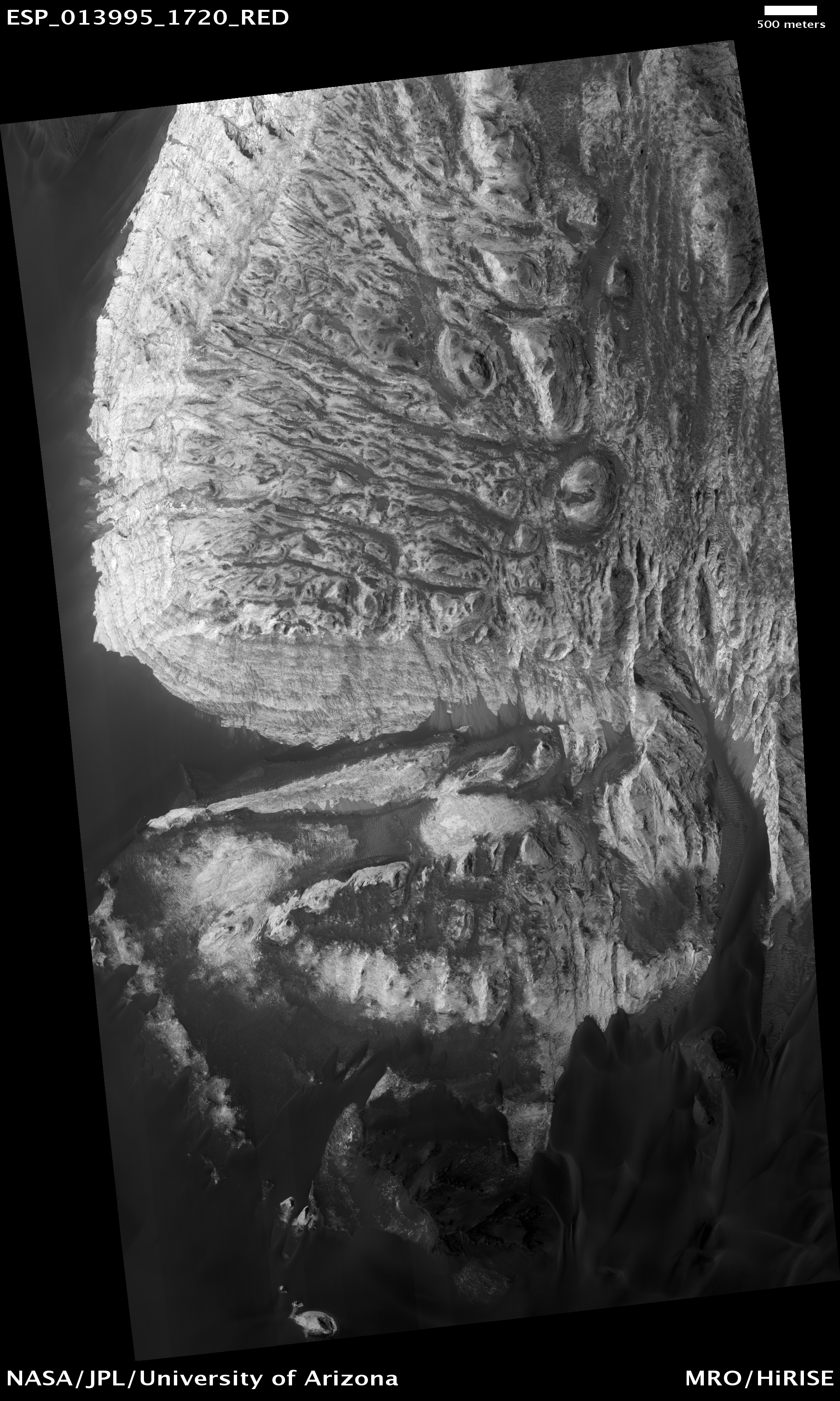
A HiRISE image of one of the edges of Ganges Mensa. The dune sea of the floor of Ganges Chasma is visible to the left of the image, with other sand dunes forming dark streaks across Ganges Mensa's cap. Fluted texturations are visible, sloping downwards to the left. Steeper slopes tend to have a lighter texturation in Ganges Mensa.

Researchers have identified two, three, four, or five stratigraphic units on the mesa that are most conspicuously defined by the presence, distribution, and length of long erosional flutes (interpreted by many researchers as yardangs and, historically, possibly as the result of groundwater sapping), and thematically consistent features of differing albedo. Yardangs are fleets of elongated linear features cut from bedrock by winds that blow in a sustained direction, surficially covering vast swaths of the mesa. These landforms are generally hundreds of meters long and tens of meters high, but they have been observed to become much larger on the northern face of Ganges Mensa. The mesa's southwestern face is steeper and contains the most well-incised examples of yardangs on the landform, suggesting that wind erosion was most severe on this part of the mesa. These units were deposited in at least two depositional events, interspersed by at least one or possibly two extended periods of erosion, depending on specific interpretations about the presence of angular conformities observed in the stratigraphy.

The basal stratigraphic units of Gange Mensa demonstrate spectral signatures of polyhydrated sulfates like kieserite, which are visible up to elevations of 1,900 metres (6,200 ft) uphill on the mesa. These sulfate signatures are not consistently represented elsewhere in the Valles Marineris network but are present within Eos Chasma and Capri Chasma and particularly on Capri Mensa, which lies to the south. Some of these units are scored by what have been interpreted by some researchers to be foreset beds of dark aeolian (wind-formed) materials. These dark beds lack any spectral signatures of common mafic minerals such as pyroxenes, olivine, or iron oxides (like hematite). Against fluted terrains the beds have been observed to dip between 15° and 25°. These thick and friable units, at their greatest extents, reach up to 1 kilometre (3,000 ft) in thickness.

They are capped by a highly resistant unit interpreted by some researchers to be volcanic in origin, but which has been undermined by the erosion of the underlying weak rock. The cap rock of Ganges Mensa does not display this dipping and instead appears to horizontally stack atop these layers. These layers have been tentatively dated to the Mid-to-Late Amazonian period, concurrent with the formation of some outflow channels debouching out into Chryse Planitia. Dark domes and ridges on the cap of the material have been historically associated with volcanic modification but have more recently been proposed to be the intrusive feeding source of this cap rock. Because of this susceptibility to erosion and collapse, Ganges Mensa was likely once far more extensive than it appears to currently be. An exhumed crater apron nearly 10 kilometres (6 mi) to the east of the mesa appears to cross-cut a structure that has been interpreted by some researchers to be a now-buried part of the mesa. Large-scale mass wasting of these weaker stratigraphic units (most notably, in the landslide of two blocks down the southern face of the mesa) has been conspicuously observed on the mesa.

The observed layers described above—termed interior layered deposits by researchers—are of considerable interest to researchers studying the possibility of past life on Mars due to the spectrally-inferred presence of kieserite, a polyhydrated magnesium sulfate mineral. Such a mineral only forms in sufficient quantities in acidic aqueous environments, suggesting the longstanding presence of water in areas where these materials are found. Ganges Mensa is the westernmost of the regions where these kinds of layers have been found in the greater Valles Marineris region. In terrestrial situations, polyhydrated sulfates are almost always found together with hematite (an iron oxide mineral that also is known to form diagenetically in neutral aqueous environments), but no spectral signatures of hematite have been found with kieserite in Ganges Mensa. Researchers have speculated that hematite in Ganges Mensa has since weathered out and is no longer present within the ILDs there in significant quantities. Hematite has been found elsewhere in interior layered deposits downstream, suggesting that the aqueous environments of Valles Marineris including Ganges Mensa grew less and less acidic into the late Hesperian and early Amazonian.

=== Formation mechanism interpretations ===
==== Subglacial volcanism hypothesis ====
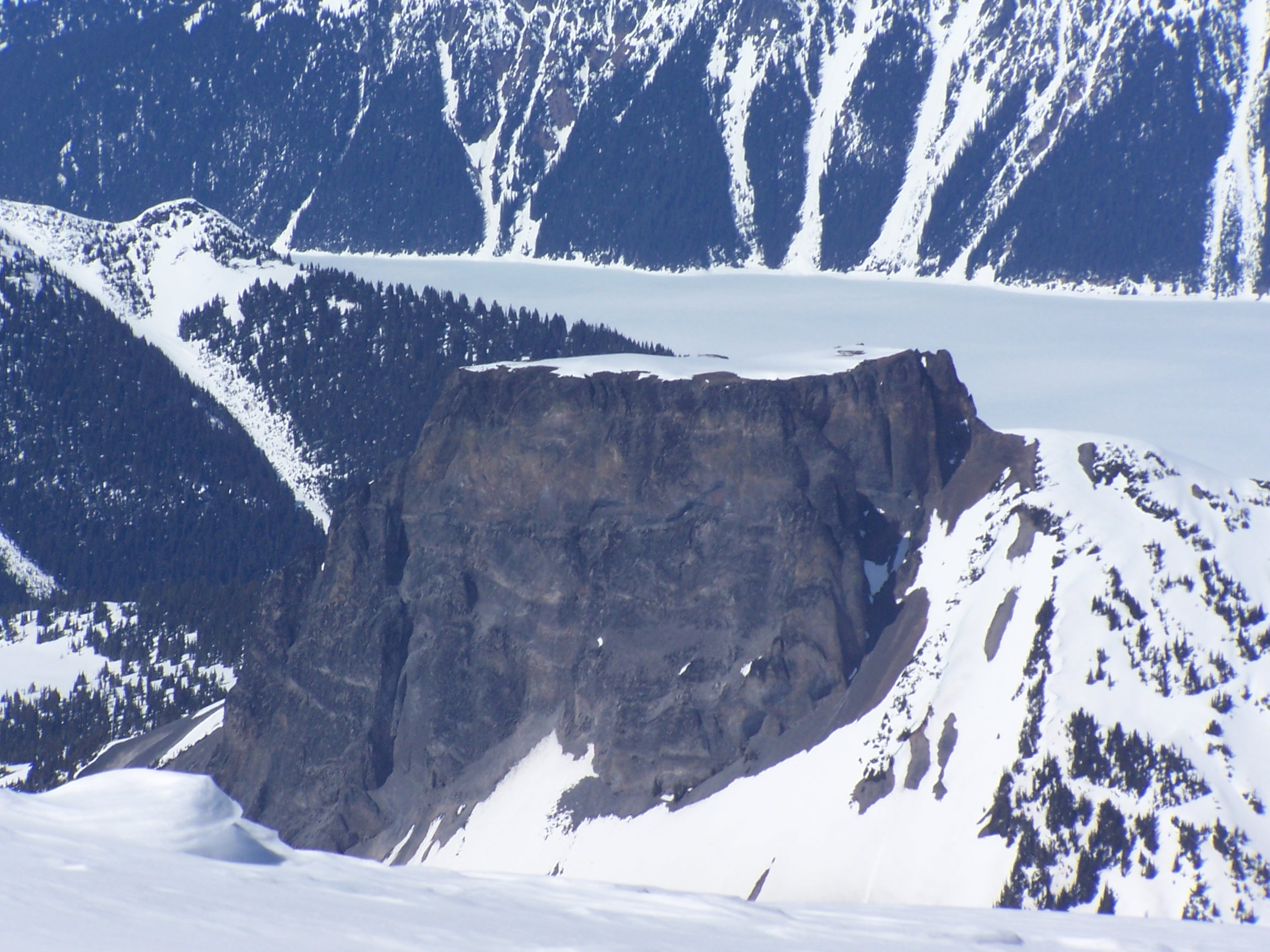
The Table, a tuya in British Columbia. Some researchers have attempted to analogize Ganges Mensa to the tuyas of British Columbia, which are thought to have formed as a result of subglacial volcanic activity.

The Ganges Mensa province and other interior layered deposits in Valles Marineris have been strongly analogized to the Azas Plateau, a region in the Tuva Republic (a federal subject of Russia) near Lake Baikal and the Mongolian border. The Azas Plateau volcanic field is thought to have formed through subglacial volcanism; that mechanism is used accordingly to interpret the geomorphology of Ganges Mensa, which has been analogized to a terrestrial landform known as a tuya. It has been proposed by some researchers that Ganges Mensa might be an extremely eroded version of one. Historically, other researchers have alternatively proposed that the modern shape of Ganges Mensa was a depositional and not erosional effect. The volcanic activity that formed Ganges Mensa could have occurred into a gigantic pingo-like laccolith composed of ice, or into a thoroughly-frozen lake within Ganges Chasma.

Supporters of the subglacial volcanism origin hypothesis note that the Ganges Mensa's horizontally-oriented cap rock is morphologically consistent with the cap rock seen in tuyas in the Azas Plateau. Various domes and arcuate ridges have been observed across the cap rock of Ganges Mensa, leading some to speculate that these likely volcanic landforms are actually evidences of magmatic dikes, volcanic vents, or the erosional remnants of volcanic necks that may have intruded underlying layers to deposit the cap rock.

The presence of extensive thin layering in the thick friable stratigraphic units underneath Ganges Mensa's cap rock could correspond closely to hyaloclastites, which are volcanic breccias that are formed when lavas are erupted directly into water or ice and then quenched. The proposed hyaloclastite facies have been analogized to those comprising tuyas in Iceland. Other authors have proposed that these layered terrains could constitute alternating mafic flows and tuffs made of palagonite, as has been observed in some Icelandic tuyas.

Researchers have noted, however, that the studied mesas of Valles Marineris, including Ganges Mensa, are surrounded by an extensive dune sea that has never been observed in the vicinity of terrestrial tuyas. On the mesa itself, foreset beds are typical of terrestrial tuyas, but the dips of the bedding observed within Ganges Mensa are far steeper than those that have been observed in the tuyas of British Columbia.

==== Subaqueous volcanism hypothesis ====
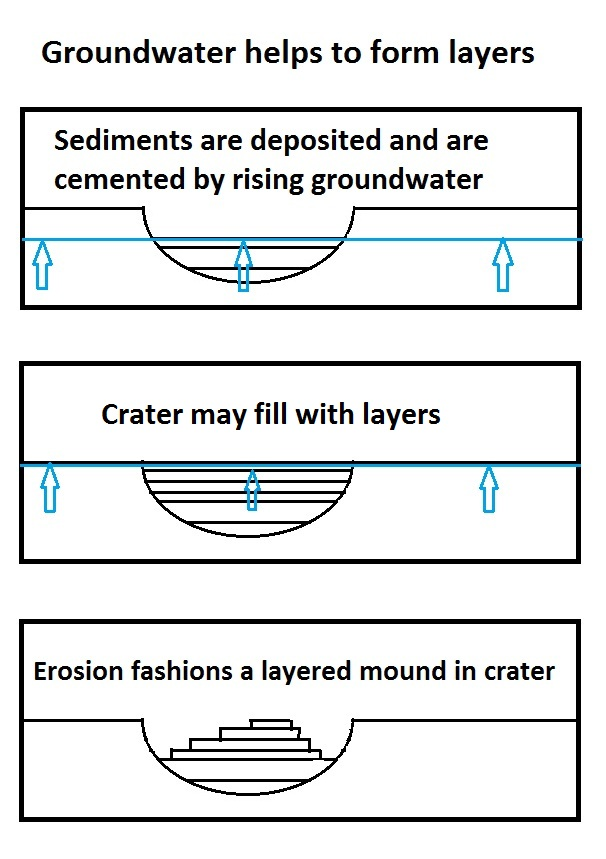
A cartoon showing one proposed mechanism for the formation of Ganges Mensa, according to those who favor a depositional hypothesis for the formation of the interior layered deposits that have been described to form Ganges Mensa.

Those who favor a subaqueous hypothesis for Ganges Mensa's formation argue that the mesa developed due to a combination of volcanic and sedimentary factors underneath a persistent kilometres-deep paleolake. Supporters of this hypothesis tend to favor a low-energy depositional explanation to the formation of the mesa rather than a subglacial one, with the basal sulfate-enriched IDLs deposited during the Hesperian, when the circum-Chryse outflow channels were forming.

A subaqueous formation could explain the thinly-layered friable deposits within the walls of Ganges Mensa if they were turbidites, but because the sedimentary particles may be variable in composition and in distance traveled from source, the traditional Bouma sequence characteristic of terrestrial turbidites may not necessarily be observed.

Critics of this hypothesis for Ganges Mensa note that there are no barriers in the chasmata that appear to confine a putative paleolake downstream towards the outflow channels that they usually source (such as how Ganges Chasma opens into the uplands of Chryse Planitia), and how there are no observed morphologies on Ganges Mensa or on any of the other mesas of Valles Marineris that could conceivably correspond to paleoshoreline benches. More generally, Hebes Mensa also extends to a higher elevation than the rim of Hebes Chasma, which has implications on the broader formational mechanism of the valley mesas that are unlikely to be explained by a lacustrine mechanism. However, it is entirely possible that resurfacing could have eradicated any sign of such paleoshorelines, and that the geometry of Ganges Chasma might have been different enough in the past to have supported the presence of a deep paleolake.

== Observational history ==
=== 20th century ===
In 1987, Susan S. Nedell and David W. Andersen (San Jose State University) and Steven W. Squyres (NASA Ames Research Center) reported on the presence of layered deposits across Valles Marineris, offering the first detailed observations about the structure, stratigraphy, distribution and composition of the landforms within the valley network on Viking imagery. They focused particularly on deposits in Candor Chasma, making some regional generalizations. Nedell and her co-authors offered preliminary hypotheses as to how these deposits formed. The researchers concluded that a lacustrine depositional mechanism was generally the most probable formational hypothesis, against aeolian or explosively volcanic hypotheses. They also did not find it feasible to assume that the layered deposits were consistent with the materials comprising their valley walls, but did note that some canyon wall landslide material would inevitably become incorporated into these layered deposits in the case of a depositional origin. Notably, Nedell and co-workers could not firmly support or oppose a volcanic origin for the deposits, identifying no calderas associated with any of the layered deposits, including Ganges Mensa. However, they noted that the presence of some central structure—either volcanic and/or relict—could account for the large sizes of these layered deposits relative to the amount of debris one might typically expect to deposit in a lacustrine environment.

Goro Komatsu and Robert G. Strom of the University of Arizona submitted an abstract to the 21st Lunar and Planetary Science Conference in 1990 to discuss recent observations about the geology of layered terrains on the mesa with possible volcanic intrusions. At this time, Komatsu and Strom favored a lacustrine (lake deposition) origination hypothesis for Ganges Mensa.

In 1993, a study was published by Goro Komatsu, Paul E. Geissler, Robert G. Strom, and Robert B. Singer (all of the University of Arizona) examining the presence of layered deposits in Valles Marineris, elaborating on the work last discussed in 1990 at LPSC.

In 1994, Baerbel K. Lucchitta, Nancy K. Isbell, and Annie Howington-Kraus (all of the United States Geological Survey) reported on the correspondence of geomorphic maps of Valles Marineris to digital terrain models, offering their insights into the geochronology of the valley network. The researchers argued that a lacustrine origin for interior layered deposits like Ganges Mensa was unlikely, as lake levels could not be sustained at the depth necessary to deposit such large features given the openness of the canyon system, although they admitted that the geometry of the canyon system might have been different and that the different chasmata might have been disconnected or isolated basins. Lucchitta and her co-workers noted that there was no evidence that Ganges Chasma was dammed, thus making a lacustrine origin hypothesis unlikely. They first advanced the hypothesis that Ganges Mensa might have been a tuya, a volcanic table mountain formed by eruptions into gigantic pingo-like ice laccoliths or shallow frozen lakes.

=== Early 2000s ===
In 2000, Jennifer A. Waggoner (South Dakota School of Mines and Technology, interning at the Lunar and Planetary Institute) and Allan H. Treiman (Lunar and Planetary Institute) used Viking imagery to geologically map Ganges Mensa, subdividing it into four units named for major rivers in India serving as tributaries to the Ganges River (Gandak, Brahmaputra, Tista, Yamuna). Mariner 9 data was used to create stereo images of the layered deposits. Waggoner submitted an abstract to the 31st Lunar and Planetary Science Conference to report on her results. In light of the use of these MOC stereo images, the researchers were unable to definitively confirm the presence of an angular unconformity proposed earlier by Goro Komatsu in 1993.

In 2002, Meredith A. Higbie (Skidmore College, interning at the Lunar and Planetary Institute), Robert R. Herrick, and Allen H. Treiman (Lunar and Planetary Institute) submitted an abstract to present at the 33rd Lunar and Planetary Science Conference discussing efforts to performing geologic mapping and to characterize interior layered deposits (ILDs) previously documented at Ganges Mensa on data from Mariner 9 and Viking. Higbie and her coworkers used MOLA and MOC data. Elaborating on earlier work by Waggoner, Higbie chronologically separated the mesa structure into five stratigraphic units (from bottom to top: Gandak, Brahmaputra, Tista, Yamuna, and Gomti).

In 2004, Goro Komatsu, Gian Gabriele Ori (Gabriele D'Annunzio University in Italy), Paolo Ciarcelluti (University of Rome Tor Vergata), and Yury D. Litasov (Russian Academy of Sciences) first analogized the presence of the mesa interior layered deposit terrains of Valles Marineris to the subglacial volcanic features of the Azas Plateau in Tuva (a federal subject of eastern Russia) near the border with Mongolia. The researchers in particular described the presence of ILDs as mesas in Valles Marineris as likely analogues to terrestrial tuyas. This insight motivated later work by Ross Beyer and Alfred McEwen on investigating this hypothesis, in particular, in the context of Ganges Mensa.

In 2004, Ross A. Beyer published his doctoral dissertation under the supervision of his advisor at the University of Arizona, Alfred McEwen. Among other topics of study, Beyer assessed the dip angle of layers in Ganges and Hebes Mensae. The details of this investigation was reported in Beyer's 2005 publication.

In 2005, Ross A. Beyer and Alfred McEwen of the University of Arizona used MOC and MOLA data to attempt to discern the dip angle of the dark aeolian materials visible in layers within Ganges and Hebes Mensa. Such layers were originally believed to have been bedrock but were later suspected to analogize foreset beds commonly observed in terrestrial tuyas (volcanic structures that erupted into overlying glaciers), which typically are angled at around 35°. The dip angle examination was deemed possible as the terrain where these layers are visible in the south of Ganges Mensa is fluted, allowing a three-dimensional conceptualization of the orientation of the plane of at which these layer were angled. The authors submitted an abstract to the 36th Lunar and Planetary Sciences Conference to discuss their work, reporting that the dip angle of these foreset beds in the Ganges and Hebes Mensae were far too shallow to approximate those seen in terrestrial counterparts. The shape of Ganges and Hebes Mensae are also not characteristic of terrestrial tuya, but might nevertheless represent what a terrestrial tuya might look like if it has experienced very significant erosion.

That same year, Ross A. Beyer (now of NASA's Ames Research Center) submitted an abstract to present at the American Geophysical Union Fall Meeting to report on work clarifying the stratigraphy of the Ganges Mensa structure, now with higher-resolution infrared THEMIS data. Beyer argues more strongly, but not conclusively, in favor of the hypothesis that Ganges Mensa formed in a manner similar to a terrestrial tuya based on the presence of very friable, finely-layered aeolian debris against more resistant volcanic material.

=== Late 2000s to present ===
In 2006, Ross A. Beyer (NASA's Ames Research Center) submitted an abstract to the 37th Lunar and Planetary Sciences Conference reporting on his work characterizing in detail the aeolian morphologies present across the surface of Ganges Mensa. Beyer also investigated a crater off the eastern edge of the mesa which appears to demonstrate evidence of burial and later exhumation. The unveiled portions of that crater superpose a toe of the mesa, adding significant evidence to the hypothesis that Ganges Mensa was once a much more extensive landform that has since been greatly weathered.

Beyer also submitted an abstract to the American Geophysical Union meeting that year to report on the relationship of light-toned mound deposits in Ganges Chasma to the basal unit of Ganges Mensa, using OMEGA spectral data to note similarities in kieserite signatures between the sulfate-bearing mesa layers and those mounds.

In 2008, Matthew Chojnacki and Jeffrey E. Moersch of the University of Tennessee presented a poster at the American Geophysical Union Fall Meeting to report on their work characterizing the ergs of Valles Marineris using moderate- to high-resolution THEMIS, CTX, and HiRISE data. Among other results, the authors asserted that the highest concentrations of dunes within Valles Marineris—including the largest non-polar erg on Mars—can be found within Ganges Chasma immediately surrounding Ganges Mensa.

In 2008, Mariam Sowe, Ernst Hauber and Ralf Jaumann (German Aerospace Center, or DLR), John F. Mustard and Leah H. Roach (Brown University), and Gerhard Neukum (Free University of Berlin) submitted an abstract to the European Planetary Science Congress to report an analysis of the composition of the interior layered deposits within Ganges Mensa using CRISM (spectral), THEMIS (day/night thermophysical), and HRSC (elevation) data. The researchers found spectral signatures on Ganges Mensa supportive of a saline lacustrine origin, owing largely to the likely presence of polyhydrated sulfates such as kieserite. These sulfate signatures are only observed on the upper unit identified by Sowe and her coworkers.

In 2011, Mariam Sowe, Gerhard Neukum (Free University of Berlin) and Ralf Jaumann (DLR) published a comparative study of interior layered deposits across Valles Marineris and the region of its debouchment into Chryse Planitia. Ganges Mensa was one of two principal sites (along with Eos Chasma) where these ILDs had been observed and studied in the Valles Marineris network, with the remainder of the studied sites downstream to the northeast. A cross-section of a region including Ganges Mensa and Eos Chasma was prepared in the publication, and the particular formation mechanisms of the ILDs discussed therein.

In 2017, Selby Cull-Hearth and M. Caroline Clark (Bryn Mawr College) presented a comprehensive investigation of the mineralogy of Ganges Chasma using CRISM data. The authors reaffirmed the lower stratigraphic levels of the mesa as a mixture of monohydrated sulfates and ferric oxides. The deposits that host these spectral signatures on Ganges Mensa tend to contrast with surrounding terrain more darkly, and they appear to generally manifest in more unconsolidated deposits (including sand dunes on the surrounding valley floor). Olivine signatures, linear to the wall-floor boundary of Ganges Mensa, were observed by the researchers across the central edifice of the mesa. However, in 2018, Giovanni Leone of the University of Atacama published a direct rebuttal to this publication, pointing out that Cull-Hearth and Clark had crafted their study around the assumption that the hydrated minerals of Ganges Mensa and Ganges Chasma required aqueous processes to form. Leone cited a variety of publications suggesting alternate explanations for alteration that the original co-authors did not address or otherwise rebut.
