= Fluting =

Fluting may refer to:

- Fluting (architecture)
- Fluting (firearms)
- Fluting (geology)
- Fluting (glacial)
- Fluting (paper)
- Playing a flute (musical instrument)

== Arts, entertainment, and media ==
- Fluting on the Hump

== See also ==
- Flute (disambiguation)
