= Mensa (geology) =

Flat-topped prominence with cliff-like edges

In planetary geology, a mensa /ˈmɛnsə/ (pl. mensae /ˈmɛnsiː/) is a flat-topped prominence with cliff-like edges. The term is derived from the Latin word for table, and has the same root as the Spanish word for table, mesa. Mensa is used in the same manner as mesa is used in the Southwest United States.

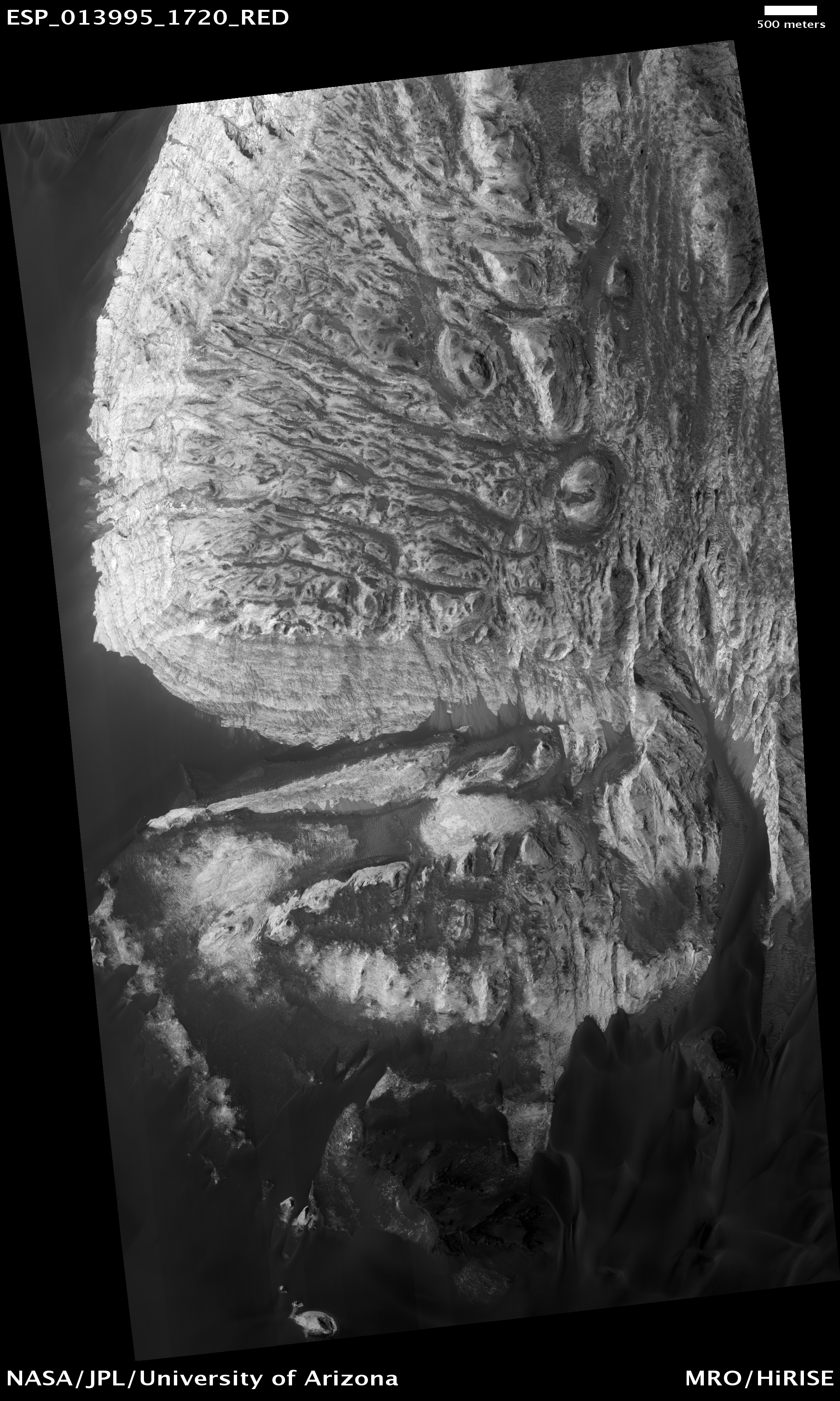
Ganges Mensa, as seen by HiRISE. Ganges Mensa is found in the Coprates quadrangle of Mars.

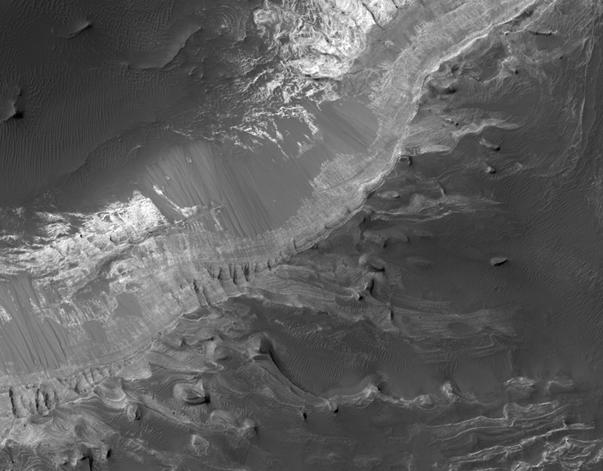
Capri Mensa, as seen by HIRISE. Click on image to see buttes and layers. Capri Mensa is found in the Coprates quadrangle of Mars.

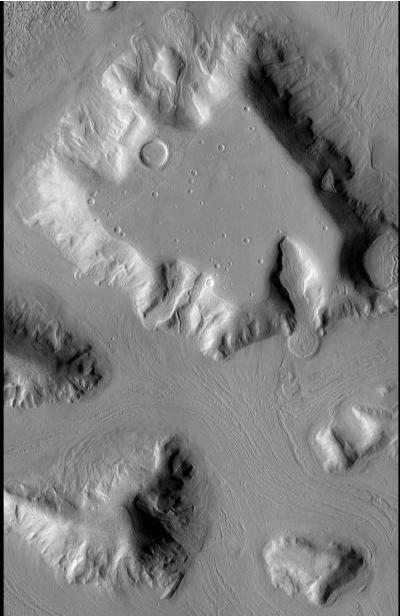
Mesa in Ismenius Lacus quadrangle, as seen by CTX. Mesa has several glaciers eroding it.
