= Hebes Chasma =

Chasma on Mars

- Hebes Chasma based on THEMIS day-time image
- Coordinates: 1.1°S 76.2°W
- Length: 319 km
- Width: 130 km
- Depth: 6 km

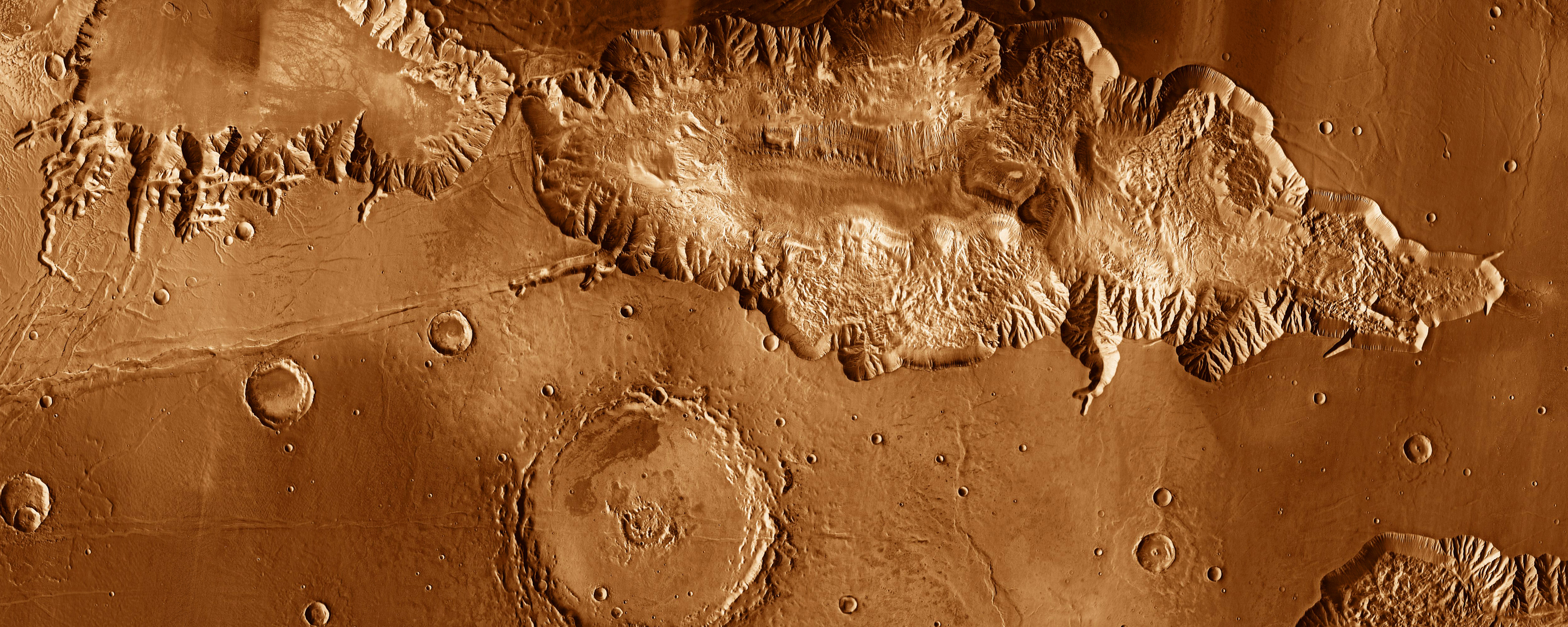
View of most of Hebes Chasma (upper center and right) in mosaic of THEMIS infrared images. Parts of Ophir and Echus chasmata are visible at lower right and upper left, respectively. Just left of center, a side canyon can be seen following a graben towards the left. Perrotin Crater is just left of lower center.

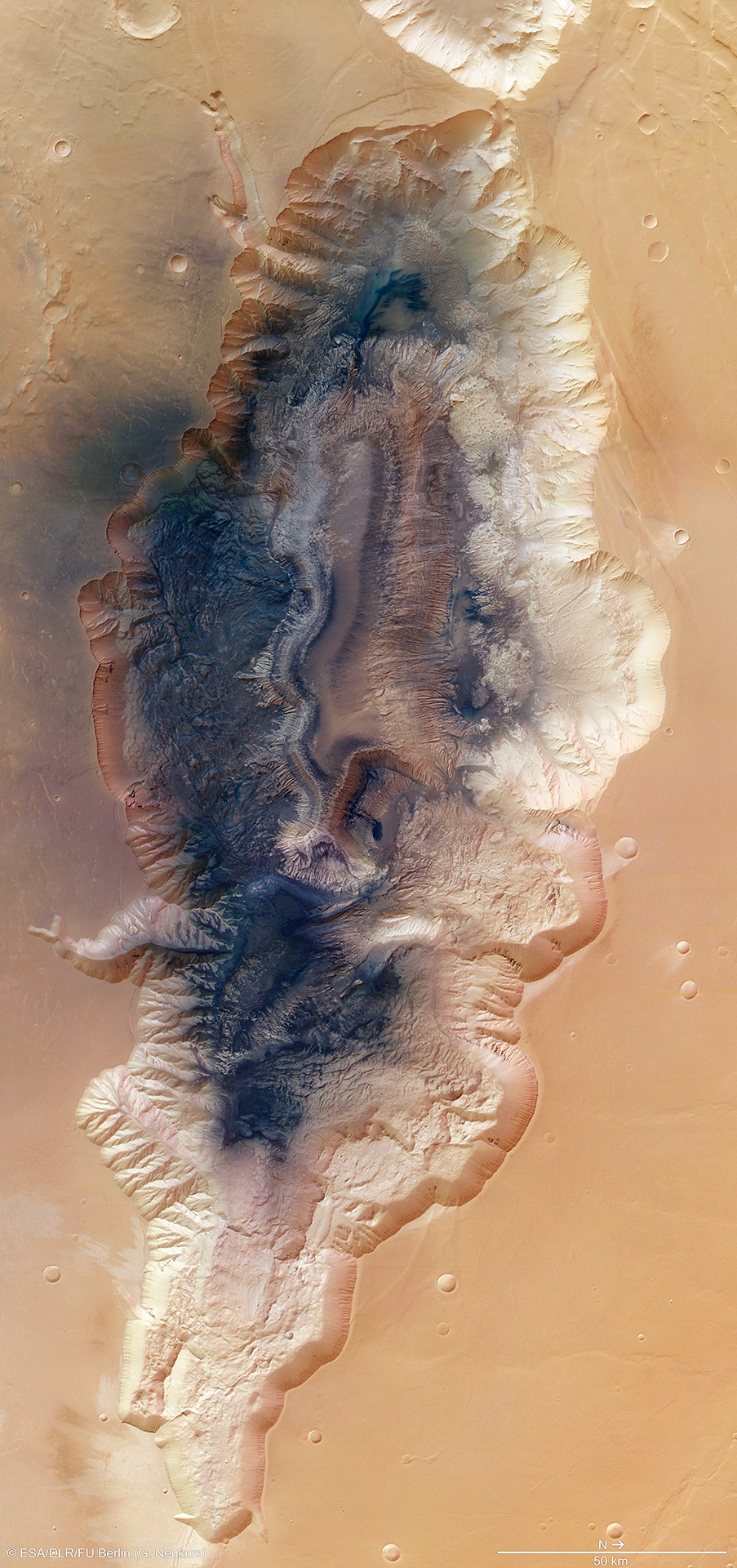
Hebes Chasma by Mars Express

Hebes Chasma is an isolated chasma just north of the Valles Marineris canyon system of Mars. It is centered at 1 degree southern latitude and 76 degrees western longitude, just between the Martian equator and the Valles Marineris system, just east of the Tharsis region.

== Geography ==
Hebes Chasma is a completely closed depression in the surface of Mars, with no outflows to the nearby Echus Chasma to the west, Perrotin Crater to the southwest, or Valles Marineris to the south. Its maximum extents are approximately 320 km east to west, 130 km north to south, and 5 to 6 km in depth. At the center of the depression is Hebes Mensa, a large mesa rising some 5 km off the valley floor, nearly as high as the surrounding terrain. This central plateau makes Hebes Chasma a unique valley in Martian geography.

== History of name ==
The word Hebes comes from Hebe, the goddess of youth, who was the daughter of Zeus and Hera. Hebe was the wife of Hercules.

== Origin of mesa ==
The walls of Hebes Chasma weather differently than the slopes on the mesa on its floor. Also, studies of the thermal inertia suggest that the mesa and the walls of the canyon are made of different substances. Thermal inertia is how long the surface holds heat. For example, rocky areas will stay warmer than dust at night. One popular idea that explains the difference between the depression's walls and the mesa slopes is that the mesa was formed from material that accumulated in a lake.

Hebes Chasma, as seen by THEMIS. Reddish areas are rockier.

== See also ==
- Geography of Mars
