= Flute (glacial) =

Long, narrow ridge of glacial sediment

Glacial flutes, also known as glacial fluting, are low, narrow, elongate, straight, parallel ridges that range between several centimeters to a few meters both in width and height. This glacial landform generally consist of glacial till, but sometimes either sand or silt and clay. They form subglacially and are orientated parallel to the direction of glacier flow. They occur in parallel sets of ridges known as swarms. Because of their narrow width and low height, they are often hard to identify during ground or bottom surveys. As a result, they have to be mapped by high-resolution satellite data or LiDAR techniques on land and by high-resolution side-scan sonar at sea.

A fluted moraine, also called a fluted moraine surface, is a moraine whose surface exhibits numerous glacial flutes. The long axes of these flutes are parallel to the flow direction of the glacier. Fluted moraines are typically associated with terrestrial glaciers, but some have been found in glaciomarine settings.

== Occurrence ==
Flutes are found in a number of actively glaciated regions including the Alps, Antarctica, Alaska, Iceland, New Zealand, Norway, Sweden, and Spitsbergen. Flutes formed subglacially beneath both polythermal, and warm-based glaciers. They are more likely to be found on recently exposed glaciated surfaces as they are readily eroded because of their composition. They have also been found in shallow glacimarine environments. Because of their relatively low relief and narrow width, they are often hard to identify from ground level observations. Therefore high-resolution satellite, drone and LiDAR methods are used to map them.

== Origin ==
Various models about the formation of flutes have been proposed. The most widely accepted model is the Cavity Infill Model. According this model, the formation of a flute is initiated when basal melting lodges a boulder on the subglacial bed of a glacial. Once the boulder is lodged, the passing glacial ice can no longer move the boulder and must flow around it. The flow of glacial ice around a boulder creates an elongated cavity in the ice downstream and parallel to its flow. The high confining pressures on the glacier bed from the weight of the overlying glacial ice fills the elongate cavity by squeezing water-soaked till into it.

As a glacier melts back and recedes, it exposes the till bed of the glacier and the long, low ridges of till that have been molded upon it. The long, low ridges of till impart a fluted appearance to the exposed bed of the glacier, giving rise to the term flute. Flutes can often be traced back upstream to single large boulders embedded in the glacial till at their head.

== Fluting ==
In older publications, fluting is used for smooth, deep, gutterlike channels or furrows cut by glaciers into the stoss side of a rocky hill obstructing its advance. This type of fluting is wider than glacial grooves and does not extend around the hill to its lee side.

== See also ==
- Drumlin
- Rogen moraine
- Fluting (geology)
