= Echus Chasma =

Chasma on Mars

- View of Echus Chasma in mosaic of THEMIS infrared images.
- Coordinates: 1.0°N 278.0°E
- Length: 100 km
- Width: 10 km
- Depth: 4 km

Echus Chasma is a chasma in the Lunae Planum high plateau north of the Valles Marineris canyon system of Mars. It is in the Coprates quadrangle. Clay has been found within it, meaning that water once sat there for a time. It may have been one of the many lakes that have been advanced for the Martian past.

Research from 2010 suggests that Mars had lakes along parts of the equator, which is where Echus Chasma lies. Although earlier research had shown that Mars had a warm and wet early history that has long since dried up, these lakes existed in the Hesperian Epoch, a much later period. Using detailed images from NASA's Mars Reconnaissance Orbiter, the researchers speculate that there may have been increased volcanic activity, meteorite impacts or shifts in Mars' orbit during this period to warm Mars' atmosphere enough to melt the abundant ice present in the ground. Volcanoes would have released gases that thickened the atmosphere for a temporary period, trapping more sunlight and making it warm enough for liquid water to exist.

In this study, channels were discovered that connected lake basins near Ares Vallis. When one lake filled up, its waters overflowed the banks and carved the channels to a lower area where another lake would form. These dry lakes would be targets to look for evidence (biosignatures) of past life.

== Geography ==
Echus Chasma is approximately 100 km long and 10 km wide, with valleys ranging in depth from around 1 km to 4 km. It is the source region of the Kasei Valles outflow channel, which extends northward from it. It is situated just west of Hebes Chasma, to which it does not connect.

Layers in Echus Chasma as seen by HiRISE.

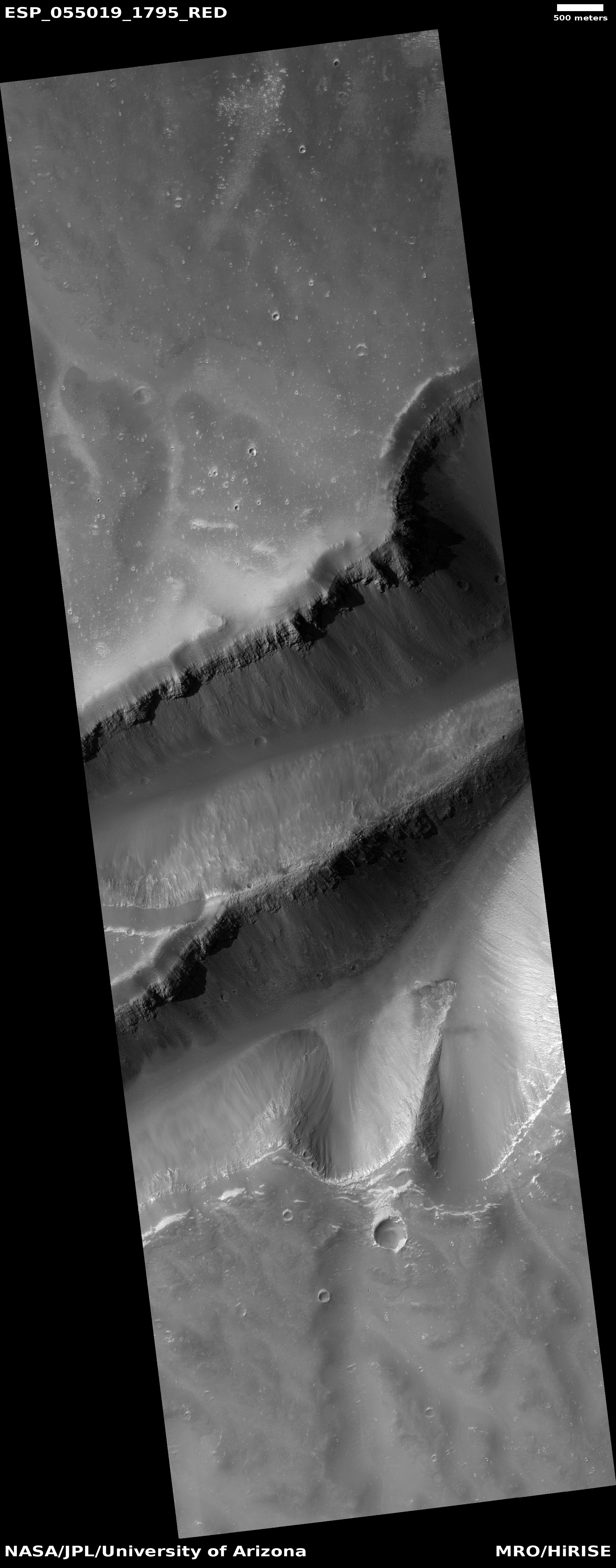
Layers in Echus Chasma, as seen by HiRISE under HiWish program.

== See also ==
- Chasma
- Climate on Mars
- Geography of Mars
- Geology of Mars
- Graben
- HiRISE
- Lakes on Mars
- Tectonics of Mars
