= Fluting (geology) =

In the earth sciences, the terms fluting and flute have very different meanings in its subdisciplines of geomorphology, glaciology, sedimentology, and speleology.

== Geomorphology ==
In geomorphology, a flute is a narrow, shallow channel that runs nearly vertically down the face of a rock surface. It is formed by the weathering and erosion of the rock surface. Correspondingly, fluting is the erosional process by which flutes develop on the surface of well-jointed coarse-grained rock, such as granite or gneiss. The includes the formation of small-scale ridges and depressions by wave action.

== Glaciology ==
For the main article about glacial flutes, please see Flute (glacial).

In glaciology, flutes are narrow, elongated, straight, parallel ridges generally consisting of till, but sometimes composed of sand or silt/clay. Flutes typically reach a height of only a few meters or less, but some may reach heights of 10 meters (33 ft), and up to 100 meters (330 ft) in length. Flutes are oriented parallel to the direction of ice movement. They are formed when boulders become lodged on the glacial till floor by basal melting and can no longer be moved by the passing glacial ice and the resulting deformation of the till bed.

A fluted moraine, also called a fluted moraine surface, is a glacial moraine whose surface exhibits parallel ridges, glacial flutes. They are typically tens of centimeters to a few meters in width and height, and tens of meters in length. The long axes of the flutes are parallel to the flow direction of the glacier. Fluted moraines mainly developed in till surfaces on land, but some have been found in shallow glacimarine settings.

Finally, in glaciology, fluting is used in older publications for smooth, deep, gutterlike channels or furrows cut by glaciers into the stoss side of a rocky hill obstructing its advance. Fluting is larger than glacial grooves and do not extend around the hill to its lee side.

== Sedimentology ==
For the main article about the sedimentary structures known as flutes and flute casts, please see Sole markings.

In sedimentology, a flute is a primary sedimentary structure consisting of a discontinuous scoop-shaped, spatulate, or lingulate depression or groove. Flutes typically range from 5–50 cm (2.0–19.7 in), in width, from 1–20 cm (0.39–7.87 in) and in depth, and from a few centimeters up to rarely 10 in (25 cm) in depth. They exhibit a steep or abrupt upcurrent end where their depth usually is the greatest. A flute's long axis is typically parallel to the current. They are typically created by the scouring action of a turbulent, sediment-laden current of water flowing over a muddy bottom. The process by which a flute is formed by the cutting or scouring action of a current of water is often called fluting. After their formation, these types of flutes are often preserved by being filled by sandy or silty sediment to form flute casts, which are infrequently also called fluting.

== Speleology ==
In speleology, flutes are grooves in the walls of a cave that are formed by the dissolution of carbonate rocks of cave walls by descending water. They are typically found in the walls of vertical cave shafts.
