= Lucus Planum =

Region on Mars

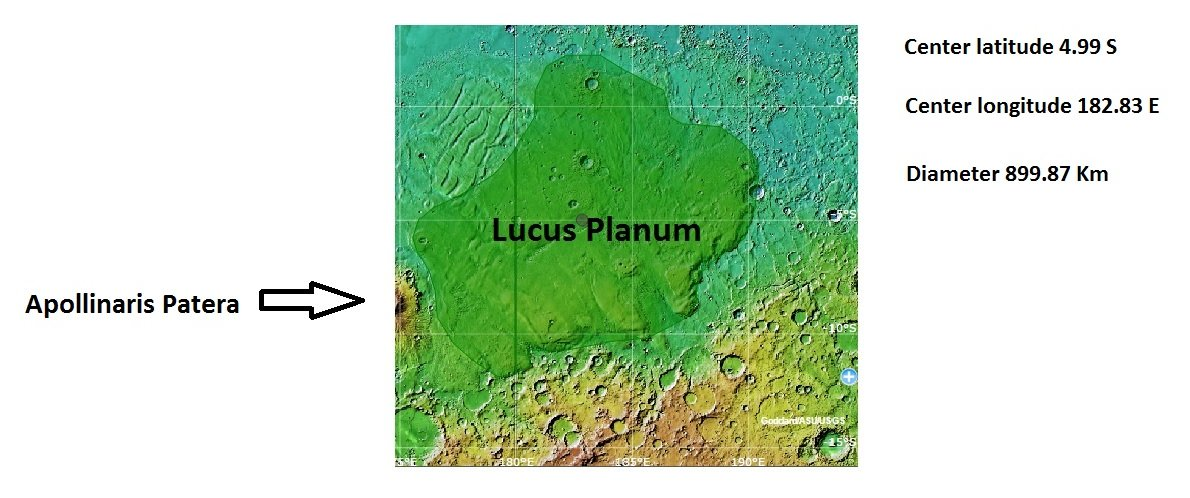
- Topographic map showing the boundaries of Lucus Planum
- Feature type: Plateau
- Location: Mare Tyrrhenum quadrangle, Mars
- Coordinates: 4°59′S 177°10′W
- Diameter: ~900 km
- Eponym: Latin lucus

Lucus Planum is a region on Mars, named after an albedo feature. Its name was approved by the IAU in 1997. The center latitude of the feature is 4.99 degrees S and the center longitude is 182.83 degrees. It lies just to the east and north east of the volcano Apollinaris Patera. Lucus Planum lies in both the Memnonia quadrangle and the Aeolis quadrangles. It is part of a region called the "Medusae Fossae Formation" Part of this region is covered with yardangs. They are formed by the action of wind on sand sized particles; hence they often point in the direction that the winds were blowing when they were formed. Views of yardangs in this region are shown below.

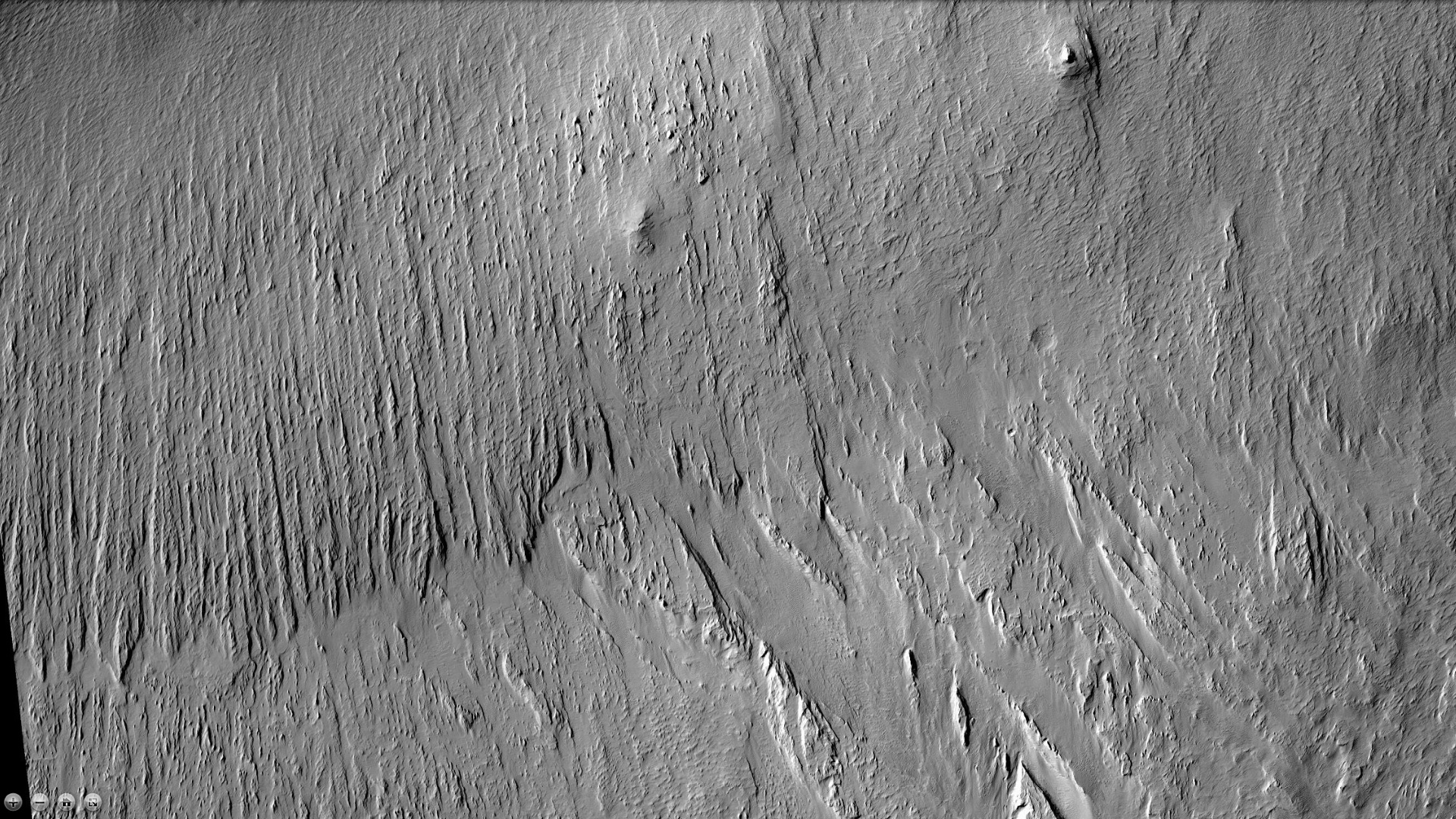
Closer view of yardangs from previous image, as seen with CTX.

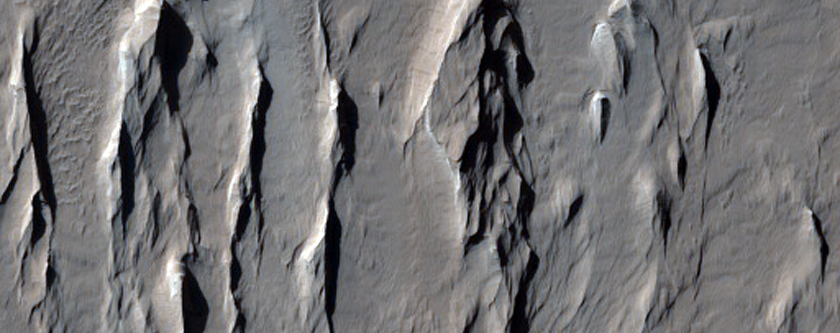
Close view of yardangs in previous image, as seen by HiRISE under HiWish program

== See also ==
- Aeolis quadrangle
- HiRISE
- HiWish
- Memnonia quadrangle
- Planetary nomenclature
- Yardang
- Yardangs on Mars
