= Medusae Fossae Formation =

Large geological unit of uncertain origin on Mars

Medusa Fossae
- Part of Medusae Fossae, from a THEMIS day-time image
- Coordinates: 3.2°S 163.0°W
- Length: 5,000 km

The Medusae Fossae Formation is a large geological formation of probable volcanic origin on the planet Mars. It is named for the Medusa of Greek mythology. "Fossae" is Latin for "trenches". The formation is a collection of soft, easily eroded deposits that extends discontinuously for more than 5,000 km along the equator of Mars. Its roughly-shaped regions extend from just south of Olympus Mons to Apollinaris Patera, with a smaller additional region closer to Gale Crater.

The Medussae Fossae Formation is part of an area called "stealth terrain" that produces little to no radar return, making it appear "stealthy" to radar signals. It is believed to be covered by a thick mantle of fine-grained, unconsolidated material, likely volcanic ash or dust.

The total area of the formation is equal to 20% the size of the continental United States. It is divided into three subunits (members) that are all considered to be of Amazonian age, the youngest era in martian geological history. The formation straddles the highland - lowland boundary near the Tharsis and Elysium volcanic areas, and extends across five quadrangles: Amazonis, Tharsis, Memnonia, Elysium, and Aeolis.

== Origin and age ==
The origin of the formation is unknown, but many theories have been presented over the years. In 2020, a group of researchers headed by Peter Mouginis-Mark has hypothesized that the formation could have been formed from pumice rafts from the volcano Olympus Mons. In 2012, a group headed by Laura Kerber hypothesized that it could have been formed from ash from the volcanoes Apollinaris Mons, Arsia Mons, and possibly Pavonis Mons.

An analysis of data from the Mars Odyssey Neutron Spectrometer revealed that the western lobe of the Medusae Fossae Formation contains some water. This means that this formation contains bulk water ice. During periods of high obliquity (tilt) water ice was stable on the surface. By means of a re-analysis of data from Mars Express' MARSIS radar, Thomas Watters found evidence about the existence of large underground water deposits in Medusae Fossae up to 3.7 km thick and covered by hundreds of meters of dust.

Combining several gravity models of Mars with the MOLA topographic dataset allowed calculation of the density of the deposit; the value is 1.765 ± 0.105 g/cm^{3}, similar to the density of terrestrial ignimbrites. This rules out significant amounts of ice in the bulk composition. In combination with the deposit's high content of sulfur and chlorine, it implies an explosive volcanic origin. The total volume of the deposit is 1.4 million km^{3}; such a large deposit might have been emplaced in periodic eruptions over an interval of 500 million years.

== Appearance and composition ==
In some places, the formation appears as a smooth and gently undulating surface, while in others it is wind-sculpted into ridges and grooves. Radar imaging has suggested that the region may contain either extremely porous rock (for example volcanic ash) or deep layers of glacier-like ice deposits amounting to about the same quantity as is stored in Mars' south polar cap. Further evidence for a fine-grained composition is the fact that the area gives almost no radar return.

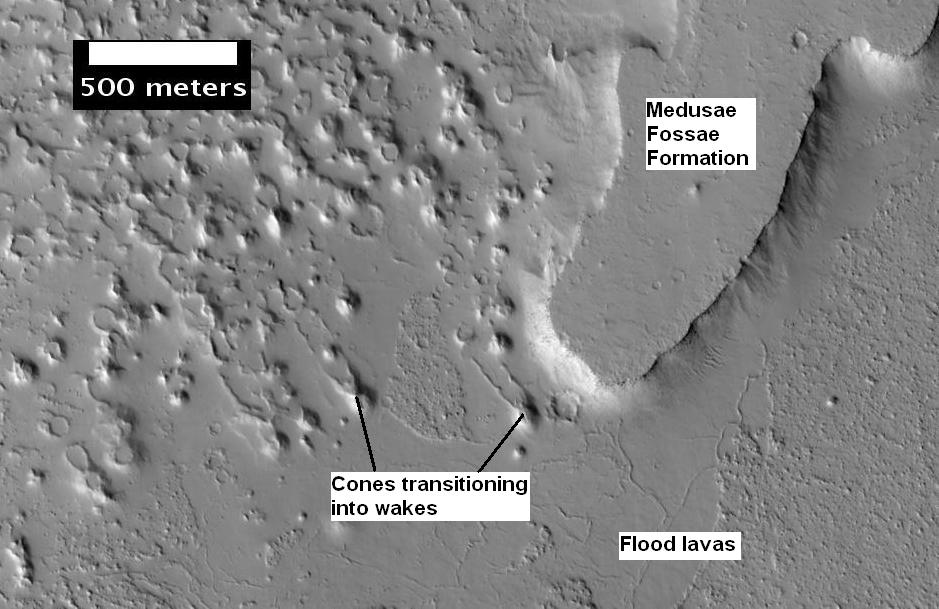
Plateau and rootless cones (HiRISE)

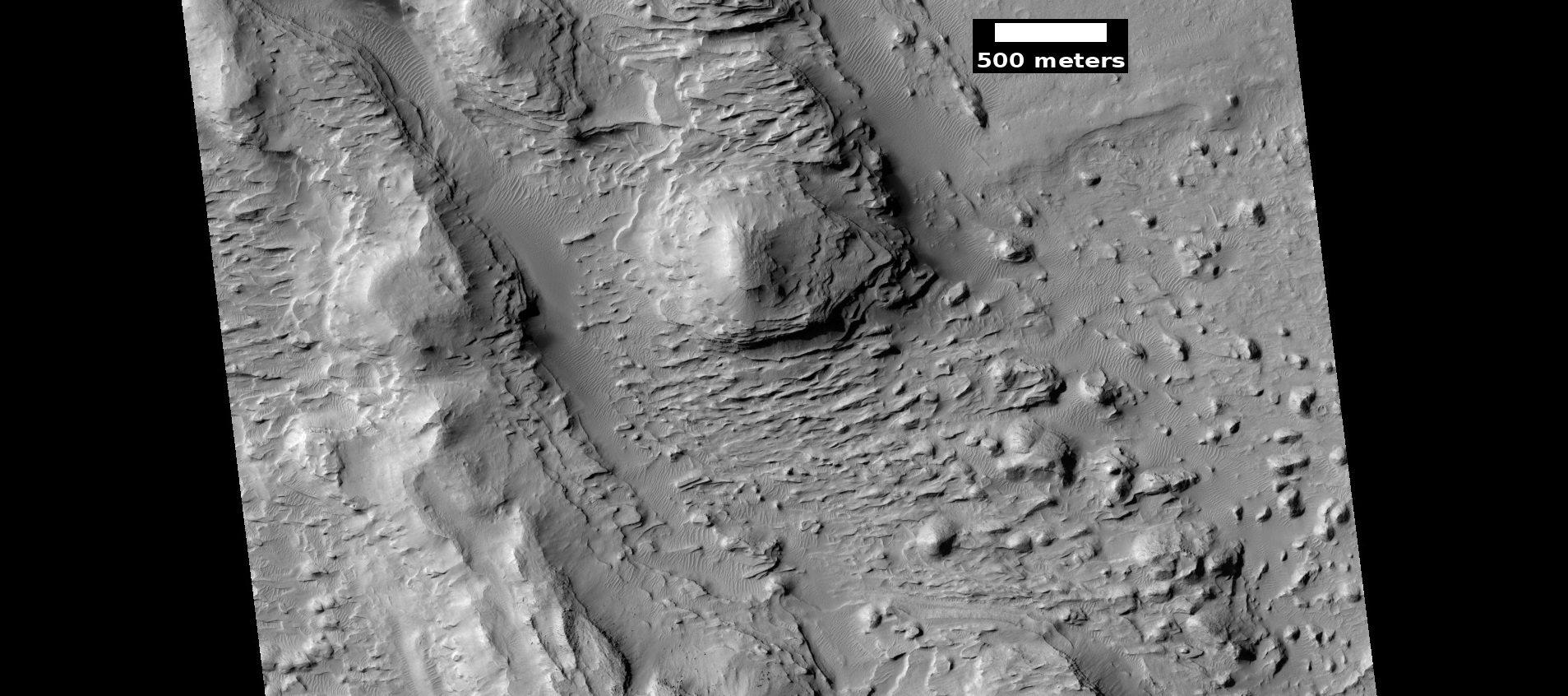
Mounds with layers, east of Gale Crater in Aeolis quadrangle

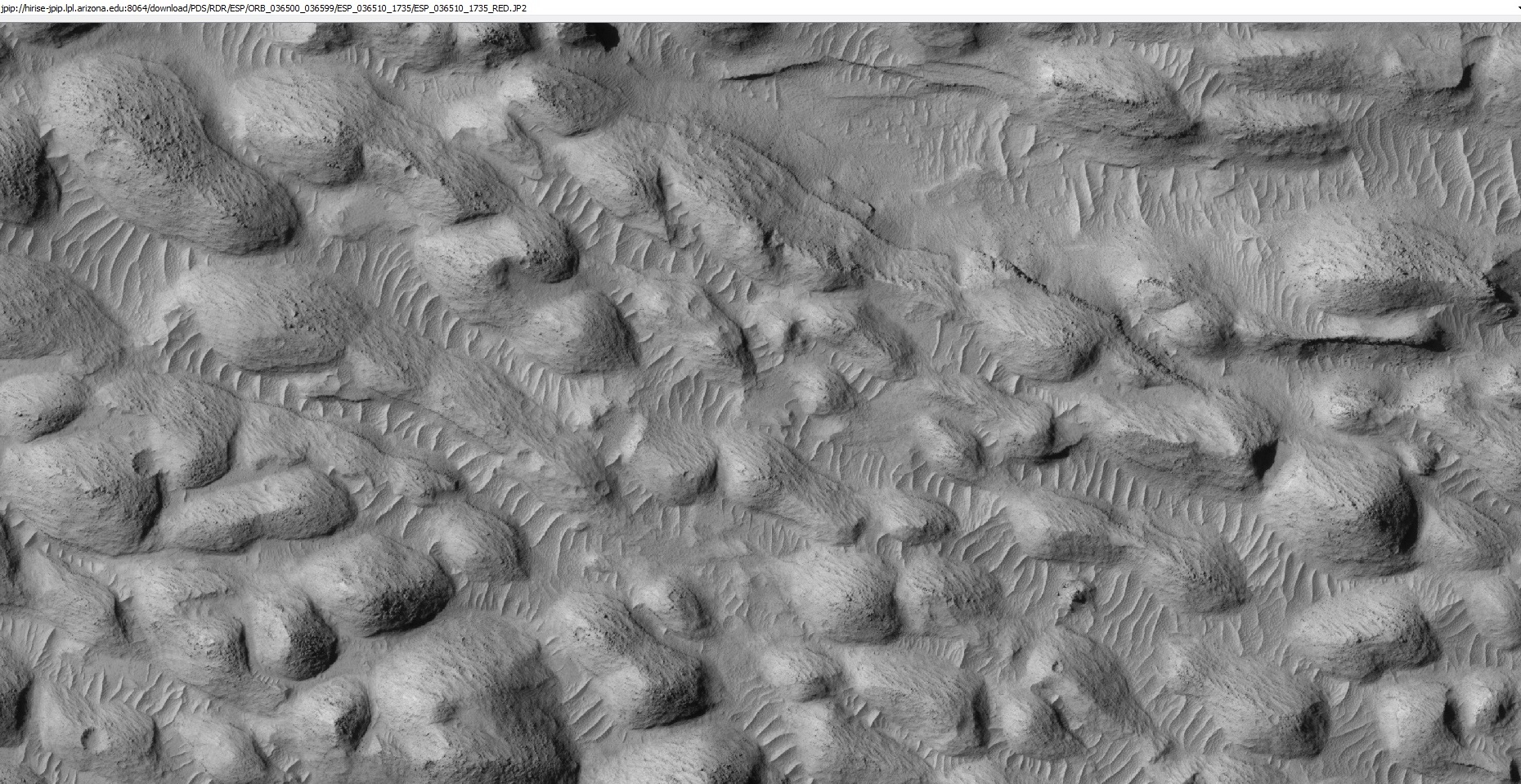
Layers and a field of small mounds, east of Gale Crater

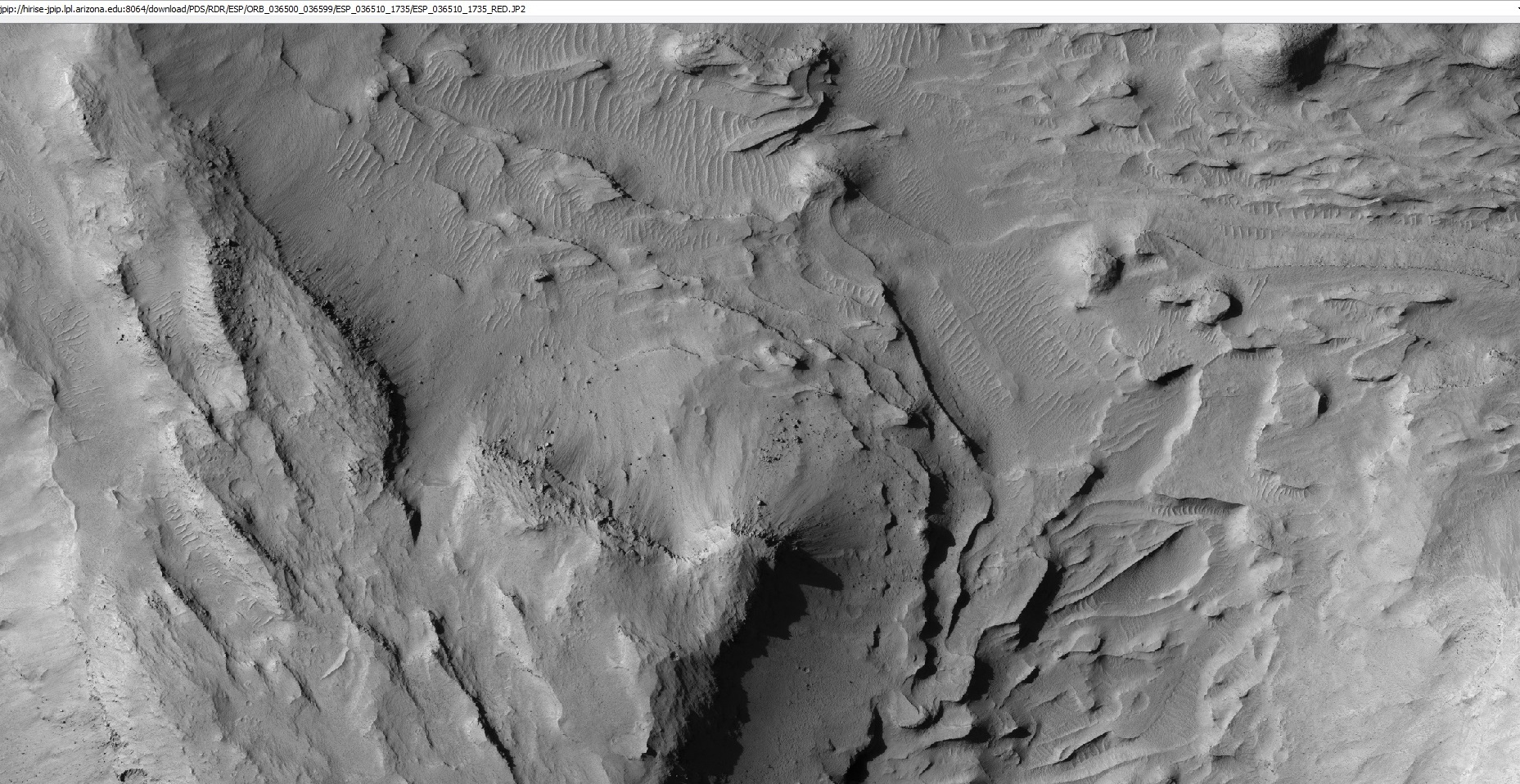
Mound showing layers at the base, east of Gale Crater

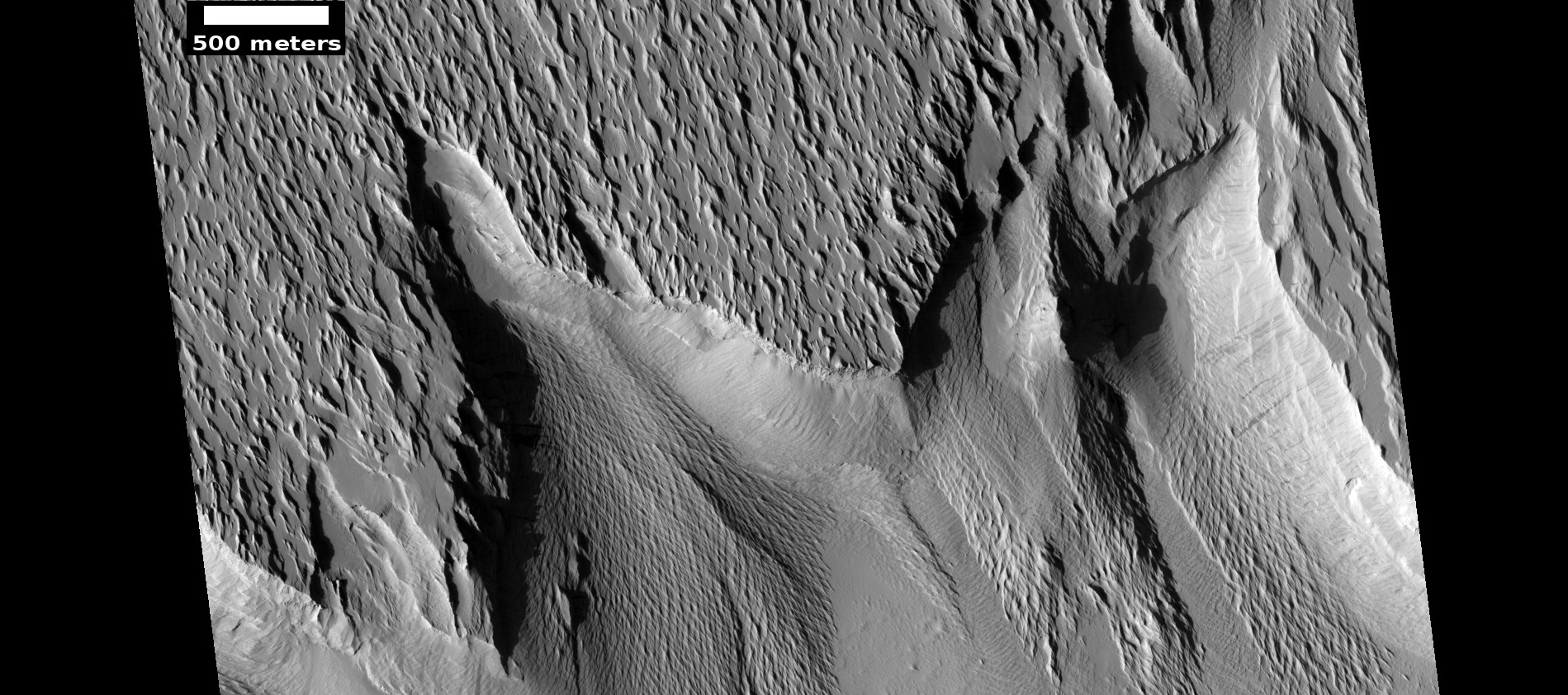
Surface features along a scarp in Memnonia quadrangle (HiRISE)

=== Inverted relief ===
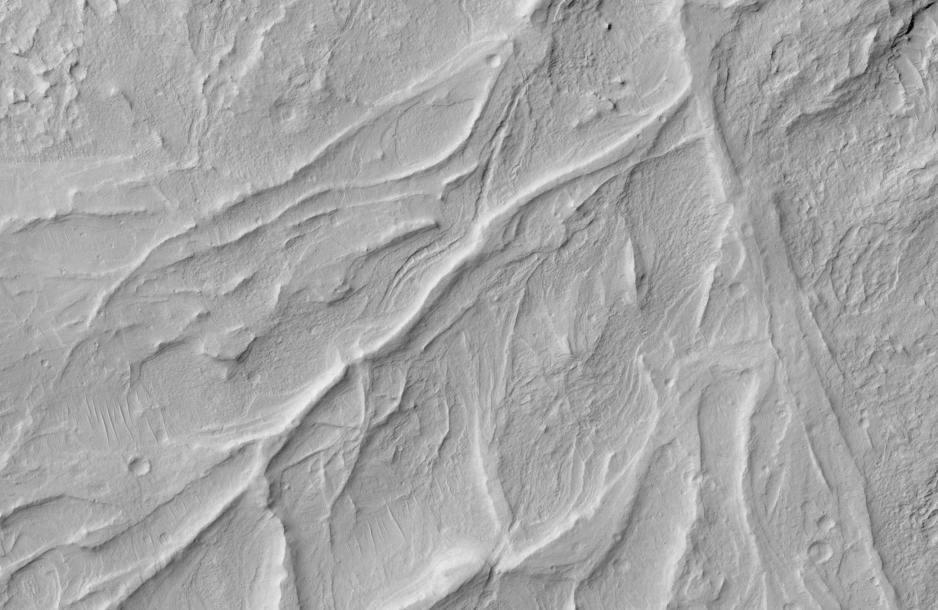
Sinuous Ridges within a branching fan, in Aeolis quadrangle (HiRISE)

The lower portion (member) of Medusae Fossae Formation contains many patterns and shapes that are thought to be the remains of streams. It is believed that streams formed valleys that were filled and became resistant to erosion by cementation of minerals or by the gathering of a coarse covering layer to form an inverted relief. These inverted stream beds are sometimes called sinuous ridges or raised curvilinear features. They have been divided into six classes: flat-crested, narrow-crested, round-crested, branching, non-branching, and multilevel. They may be a kilometer or so in length. Their height ranges from a meter to greater than 10 meters, while the width of the narrow ones is less than 10 meters.

=== Yardangs and dust ===
Comparisons of elemental composition suggest that the Medusae Fossae Formation has been a source of Mars' ubiquitous surface dust. In July 2018, researchers reported that it may be the largest single source of dust on the planet.

The surface of the formation has been eroded by the wind into a series of linear ridges called yardangs. These ridges generally point in direction of the prevailing winds that carved them, and demonstrate the erosive power of Martian winds. The easily eroded nature of the Medusae Fossae Formation suggests that it is composed of weakly cemented particles, and was most likely formed by the deposition of wind-blown dust or volcanic ash. Yardangs are parts of rock that have been sand blasted into long, skinny ridges by bouncing sand particles blowing in the wind. Layers are seen in parts of the formation. A resistant caprock on the top of yardangs has been observed in Viking, Mars Global Surveyor, and HiRISE photos. Images from spacecraft show that they have different degrees of hardness probably because of significant variations in the physical properties, composition, particle size, and/or cementation. Very few impact craters are visible throughout the area so the surface is relatively young.

Yardangs in the Medusae Fossae (THEMIS)

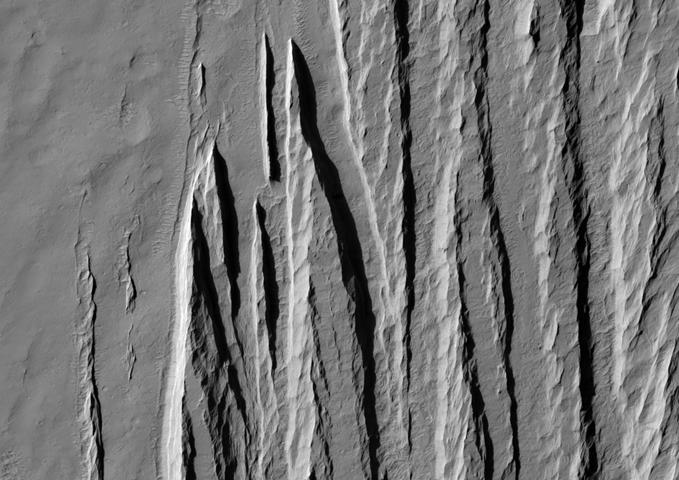
Yardangs in Aeolis (HiRISE)

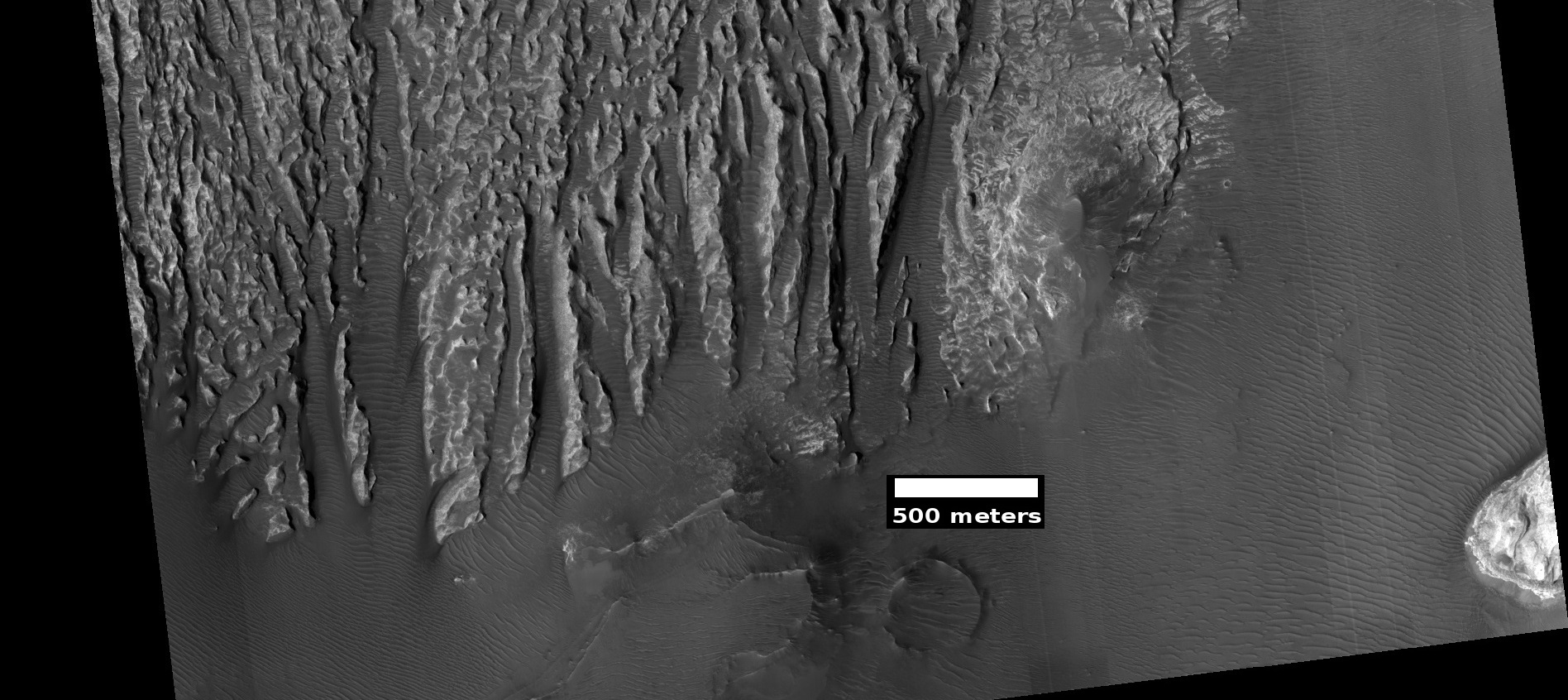
Yardangs in Arsinoes Chaos (HiRISE)

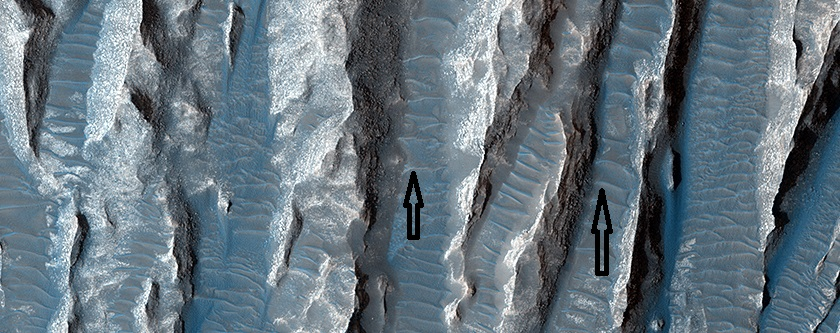
Close-up, arrows point to transverse aeolian sand ridges (HiRISE)

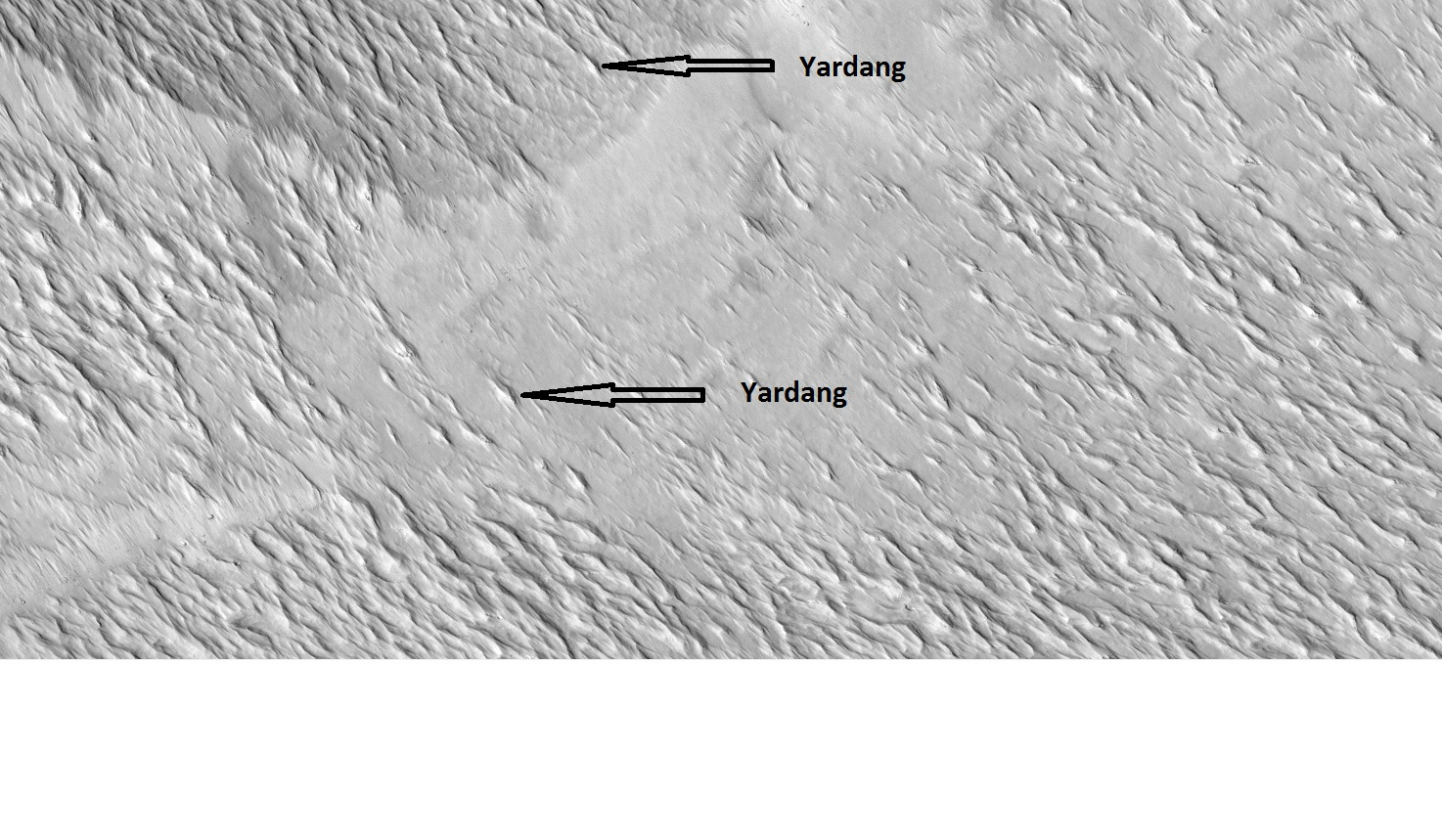
Yardangs in Amazonis (HiRISE)

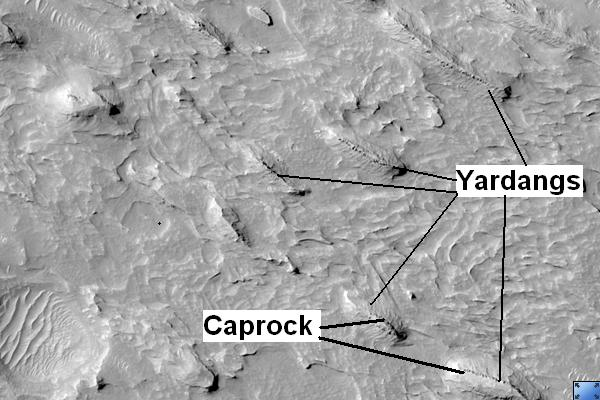
Yardangs with caprock labeled, in Aeolis (HiRISE)

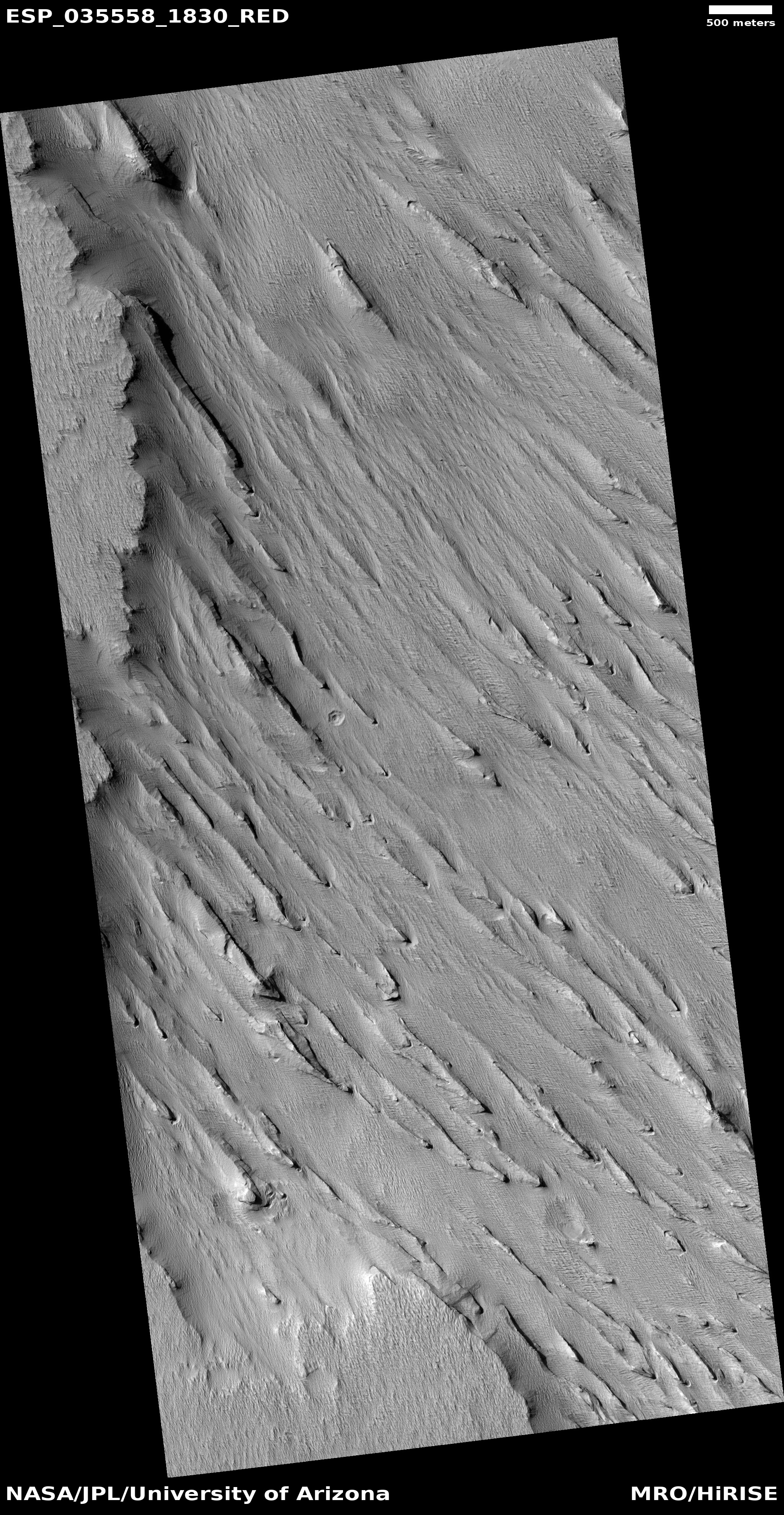
Yardangs near Gordii Dorsum, in the north of the formation (HiRISE)

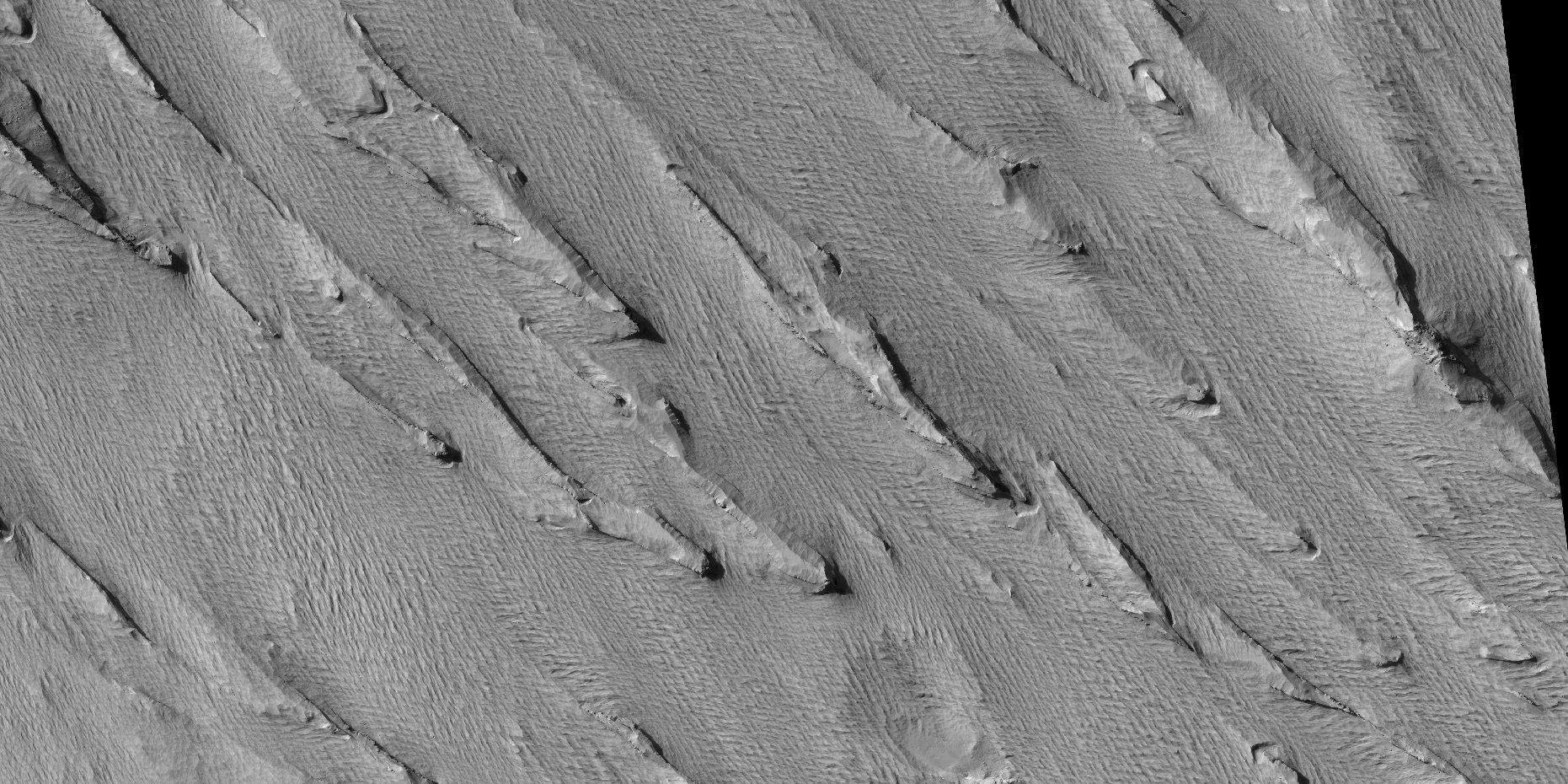
Yardangs near Gordii Dorsum (enlargement of the previous image)

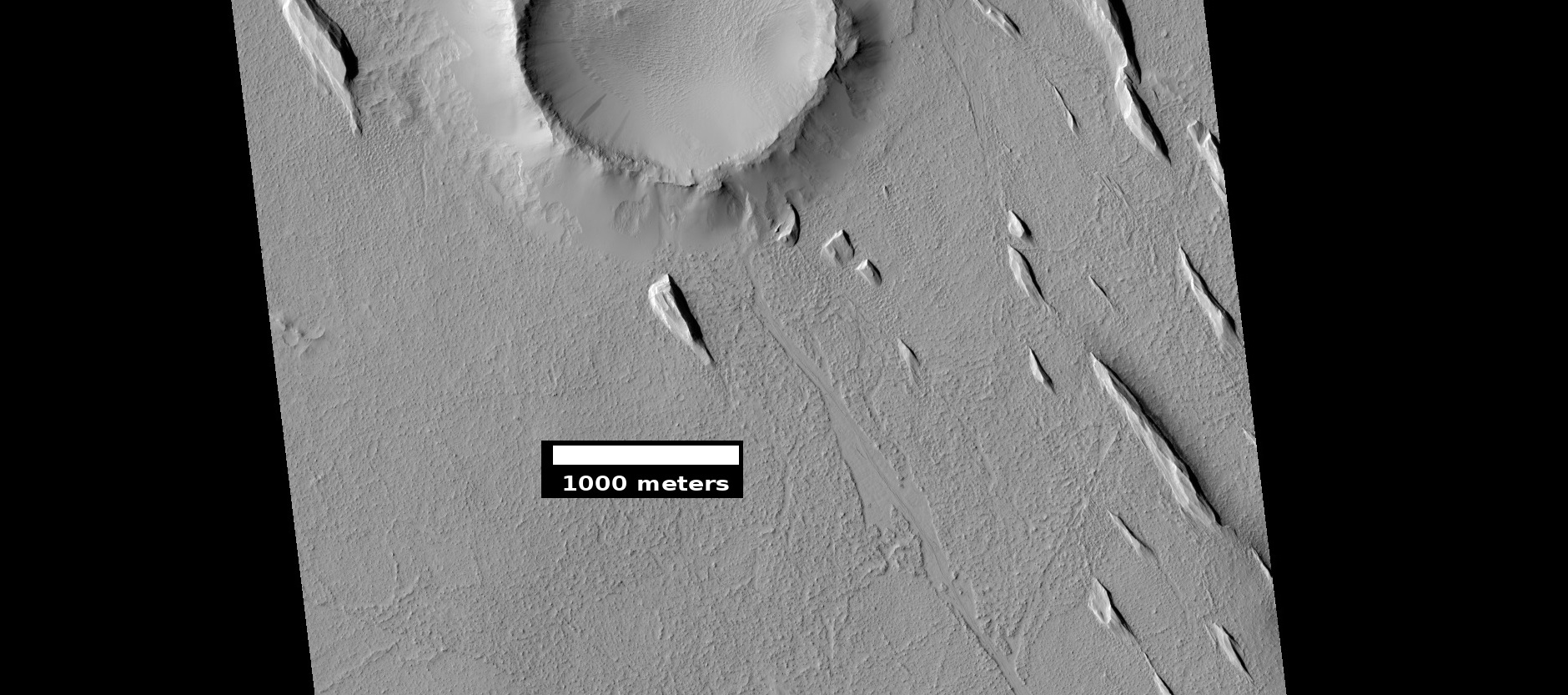
Yardangs near a crater in Amazonis, in the middle of the region

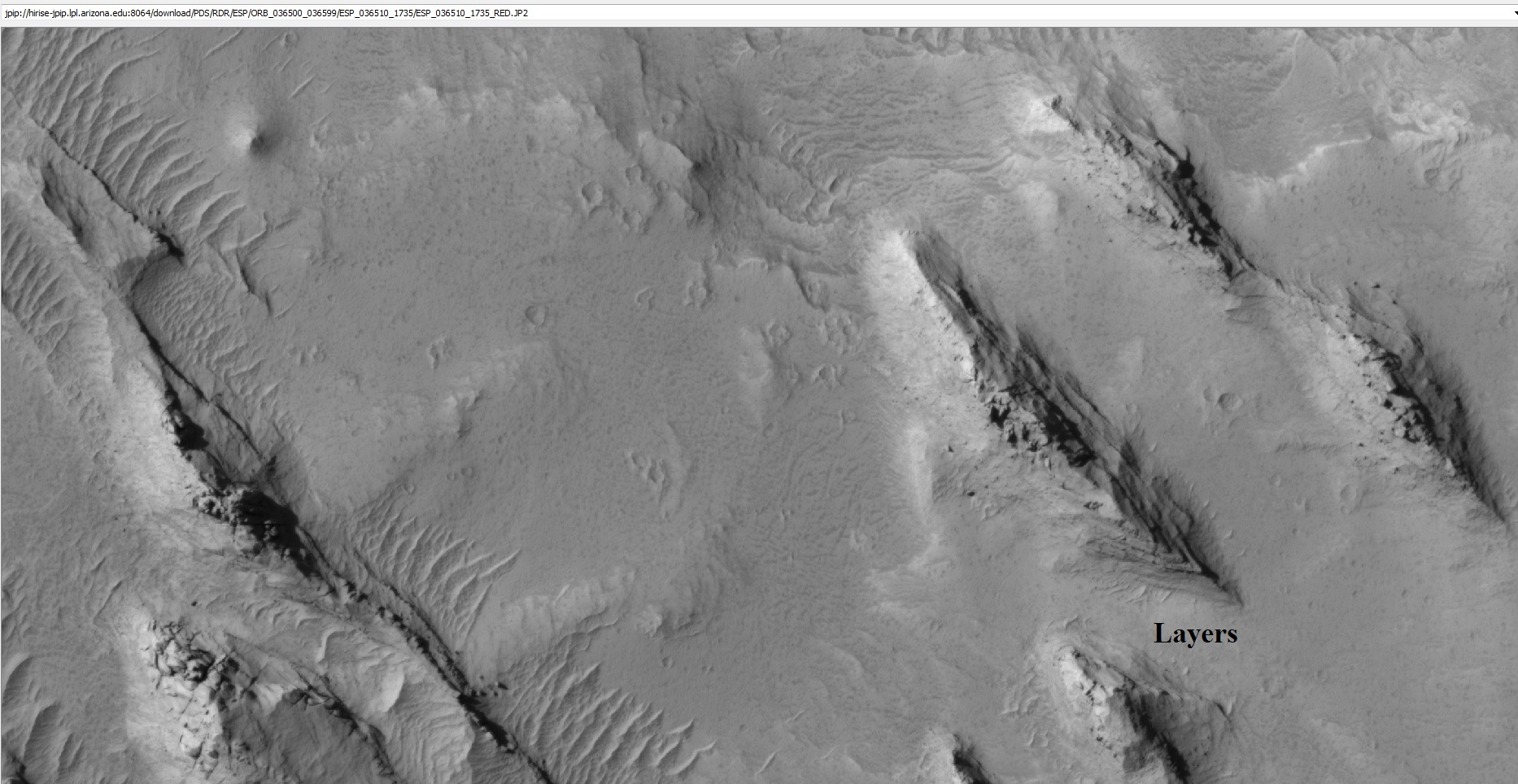
Yardangs showing layers, east of Gale Crater in Aeolis (HiRISE)

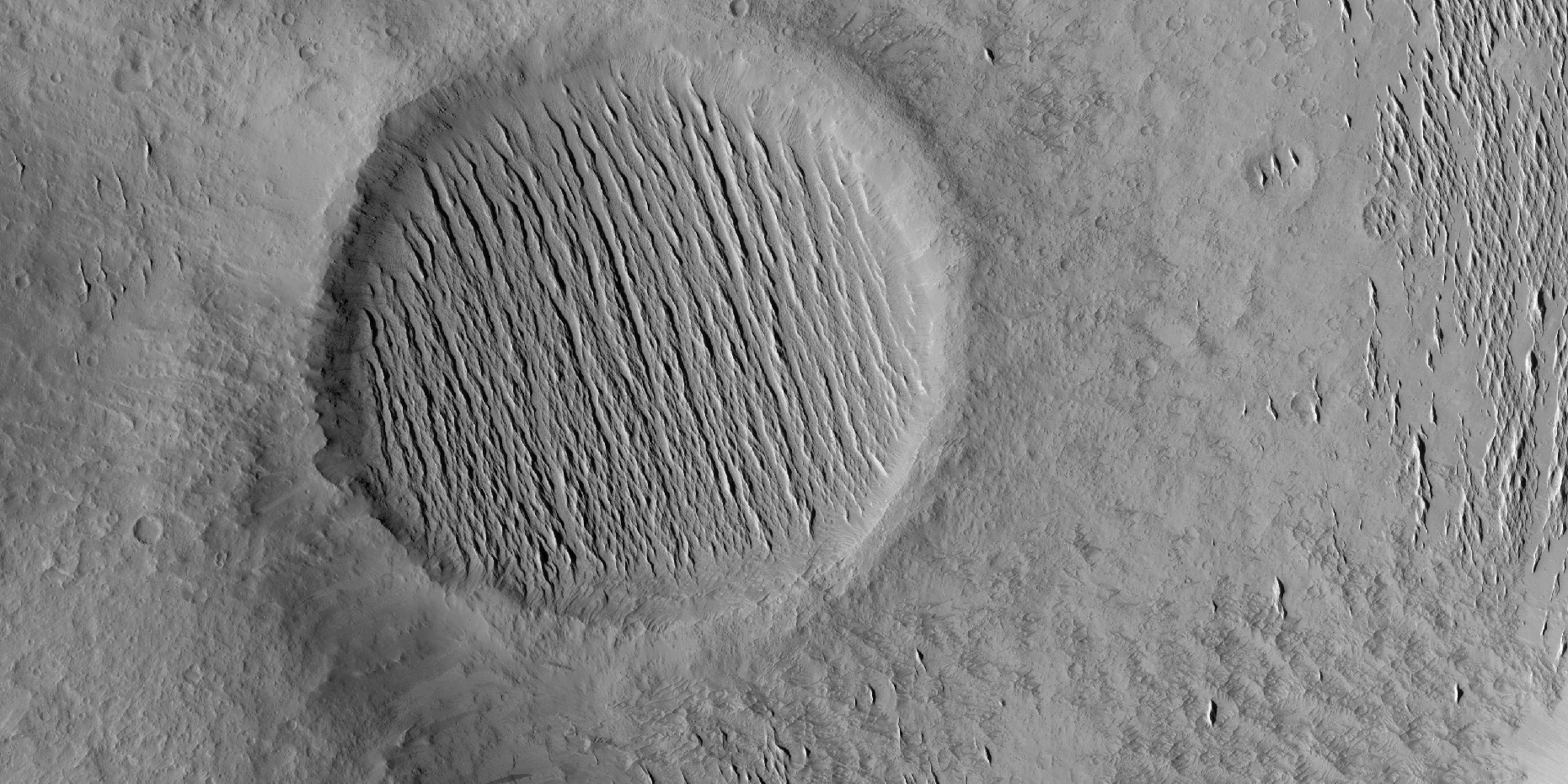
Yardangs, in a crater in Amazonis quadrangle (HiRISE)

== Evidence of Water ==
Scientists are excited about a possible “oasis” of bulk ice in the equatorial region. Having a source of ice near the equator could make it easier for future human exploration. Landings near the equator need less fuel than at higher latitudes. We know that Mars has much frozen ground, but at some distance from the equator. Explosive volcanic eruptions can propel large pulses of water vapor from the volcano to higher levels of the atmosphere. These eruptions could deposit an ash-ice mixture, or a layer of ice covered in ash. Under certain conditions the ice may be preserved for long periods. Eruptions from Apollinaris Mons lead to dispersal ash and ice deposits forming around the Medussae Fossae Formation. Eruptions from Syrtis Major can also deposit material here. The water detected by orbiting instruments could be found in many different materials. Some are (1) adsorbed water onto regolith particles, (2) water incorporated into the mineral's crystal structure (i.e., hydrated minerals), (3) OH and H_{2}O located in the structure of salt hydrates, (4) small amounts of water ice in the pores between regolith particles, (5) hydrous alteration in an aqueous environment, (6) sulfate hydration in the shallow subsurface, (7) OH that is part of the structure of clays and trapped water between clay layers and/or (8) water interacting with cations located in the pores of zeolite mineral structure.

== See also ==
- Aeolis quadrangle
- Amazonis Planitia
- Amazonis quadrangle
- Geology of Mars
- Groundwater on Mars
- Impact crater
- Yardangs on Mars
