= Hyperboreae Undae =

Sand dune field on Mars

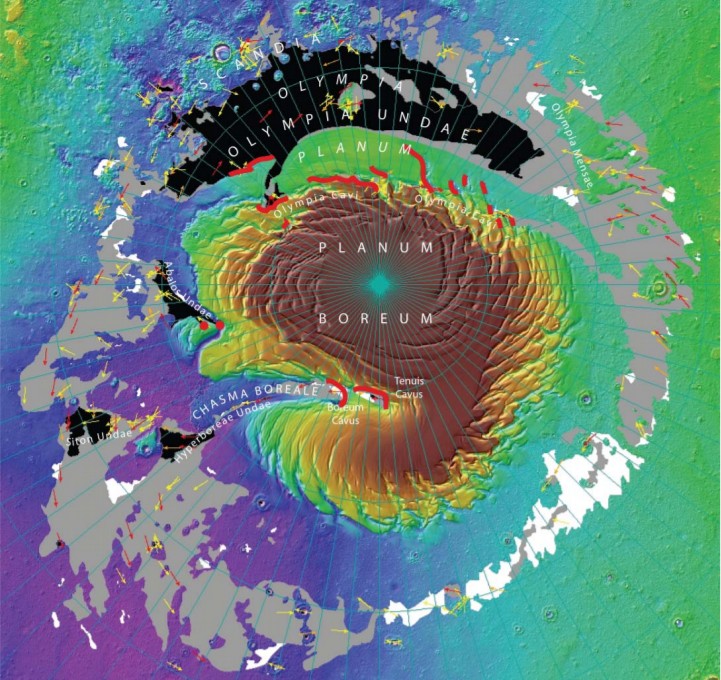
Stereographic projection map showing the density distribution of dune fields in the Planum Boreum region. The grey regions are lower density fields. The four densest dune fields are shown in black. The prime meridian is at the bottom of the map. Hyperboreae Undae is shown on the left, between longitude 302.92°E to 316.02°E (43.98°W – 57.08°W).

Hyperboreae Undae (Latin: "Far Northern Waves/Dunes") is one of the largest and densest dune fields of Planum Boreum, the Martian north pole. It is named after one of the classical albedo features on Mars. Its name was officially approved by IAU in 1988. It extends from latitude 77.12°N to 82.8°N and from longitude 302.92°E to 316.02°E (43.98°W – 57.08°W). It has a diameter of 463.65 kilometres (288.10 mi) with its centre at 79.96°N, 49.49°W.

Hyperboreae Undae is southwest of the Boreum Cavus depression, an arc-like depression at the northeastern boundary of Chasma Boreale. From there, Hyperboreae Undae continues in a southwestern direction through Chasma Boreale, and into the lowlands of Vastitas Borealis. It overlays the eastern part of Hyperboreae Lingua and the region above Escorial crater.

Hyperboreae Undae is well known for the barchanoid and linear dunes that have formed at its location, although they are seemingly incompatible. Research has been ongoing to explain the coexistence of these types of dunes at Hyperboreae Undae and elsewhere on Mars. Another type of formation found at Hyperboreae Undae is the yardang.

== Dune characteristics ==
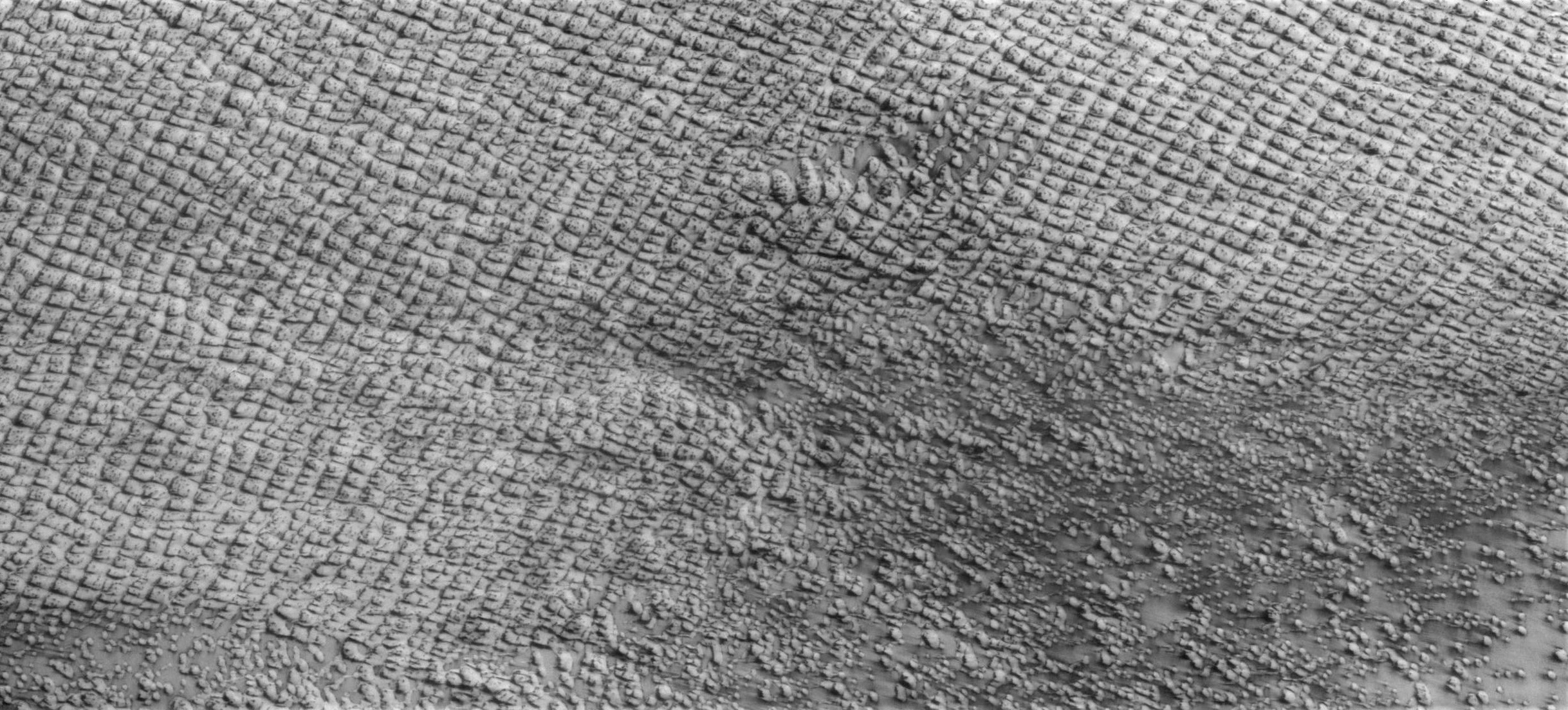
Hyperboreae Undae dunes shown with surface frost. The dunes become darker when the frost sublimates from solar heating and the dark sands are revealed.

Although the dunes surrounding the Martian north pole show no signs of movement, two possible exceptions may be the dunes in parts of Abalos Undae, and the dunes of Hyperboreae Undae. In the case of Hyperboreae Undae, the dunes close to its eastern boundary appear to be buried under the Planum Boreum 3 unit. At that area, some of the dunes exhibit dark streaks that may have been caused by katabatic winds. This may indicate sand movement, due to Aeolian activity, which is recent enough to retain the streaks, otherwise these marks tend to disappear with time; other dunes do not exhibit such marks.

The dunes of Hyperboreae Undae, according to data provided by the Compact Reconnaissance Imaging Spectrometer for Mars, exhibit the weakest signature for the presence of surface ice in the area of Chasma Boreale. Hyperboreae Undae, along with Abalos and Siton Undae, contributes sand to mainly medium-density dune fields east of Olympia Undae and extending to the Martian prime meridian,

Image analysis research, using the method of spectral derivatives, has indicated that Hyperboreae Undae, as well as the other dense officially-named northern circumpolar dune fields (Olympia Undae, Abalos Undae, and Siton Undae), show the highest density of gypsum in the area. A geomorphic comparison of Hyperboreae Undae with Rub' al Khali, Earth's largest contiguous dune field, has determined that the morphologies of the two ergs follow similar developmental patterns.

== Coexistence of linear and barchan forms ==
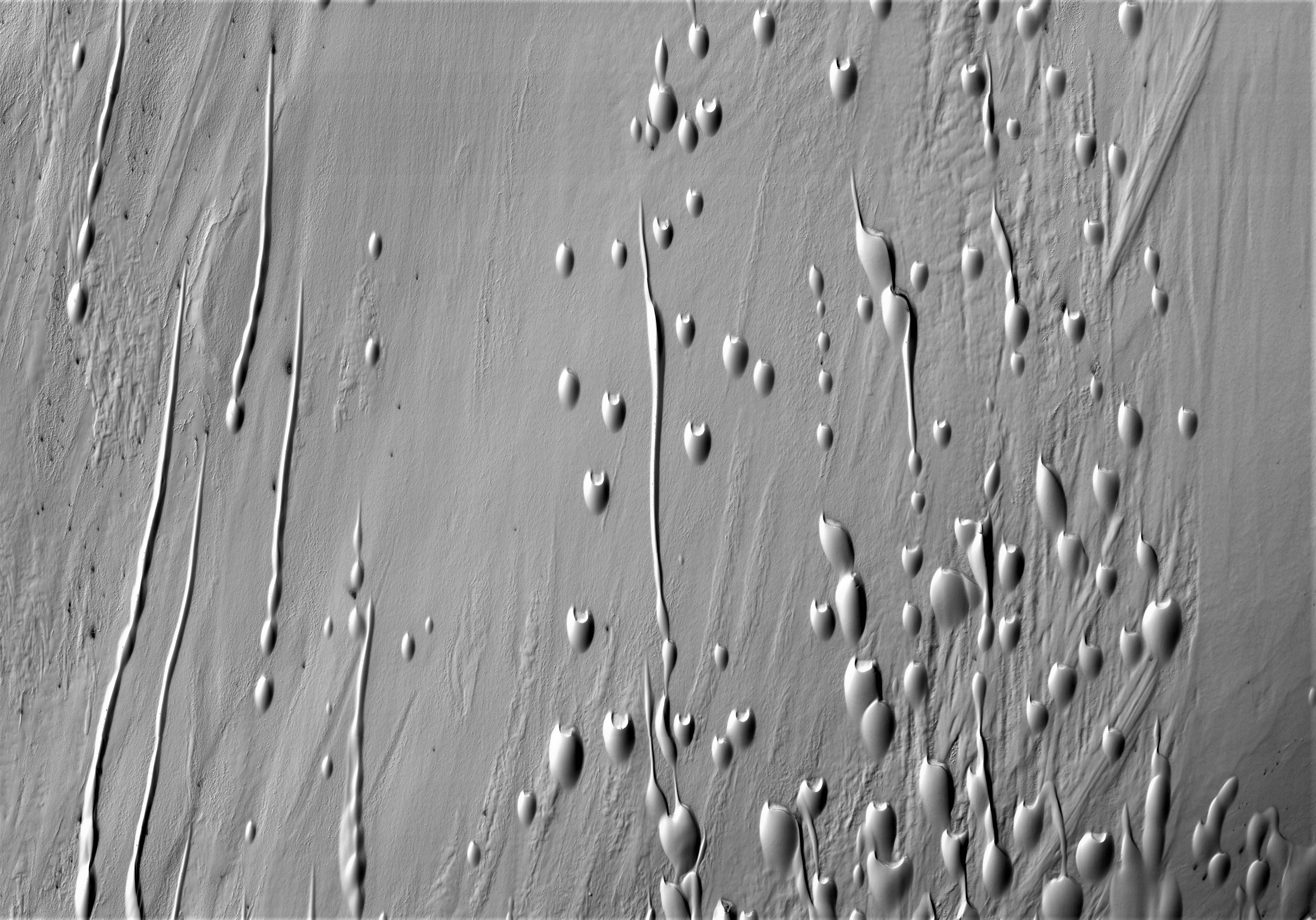
Coexistence of linear and barchan forms at Hyperboreae Undae. A study has been undertaken to explain the coexistence of these two forms. The location of the initial study site is at the boundary of Hyperboreae Undae with Boreum Cavus.

Linear dunes form primarily in bidirectional (bimodal) wind fields. Transverse dunes, also called barchan, form when there is a unidirectional (unimodal) wind regime. A third type of dune, the star dune, is typically formed in multidirectional (multimodal) wind regimes. The presence of each of these dune forms, suggests the wind regime that produced it. Linear and star dunes are rare on Mars. The existence of both linear and barchan dunes in the same location is apparently incompatible, as that would seem to imply the co-existence of unidirectional and bidirectional winds in the same place.

Research has been undertaken to explain the coexistence of linear and barchan dunes in Hyperboreae Undae. One paper explains the change from linear to barchan dunes in adjacent locations, by proposing a wind model that changes from bidirectional to unidirectional due to the influence of local topography; it is proposed that bidirectional winds change to unidirectional due to funneling action introduced by local geomorphology. Although valid for neighbouring dune locations, this theory cannot explain how linear and barchan dunes can coexist in the same location.

Another study, proposes that the linear dunes have become crusty (indurated), and thus resistant to changing form with changing wind directions. The study also proposes that the bimodal wind direction changed with time to unidirectional, which would produce barchan-type dunes, while the preexisting indurated linear dunes, due to their hardening, would remain in place. This theory is plausible, although it cannot be easily verified, because the time profile of the wind patterns for Hyperboreae Undae would need to be recovered.

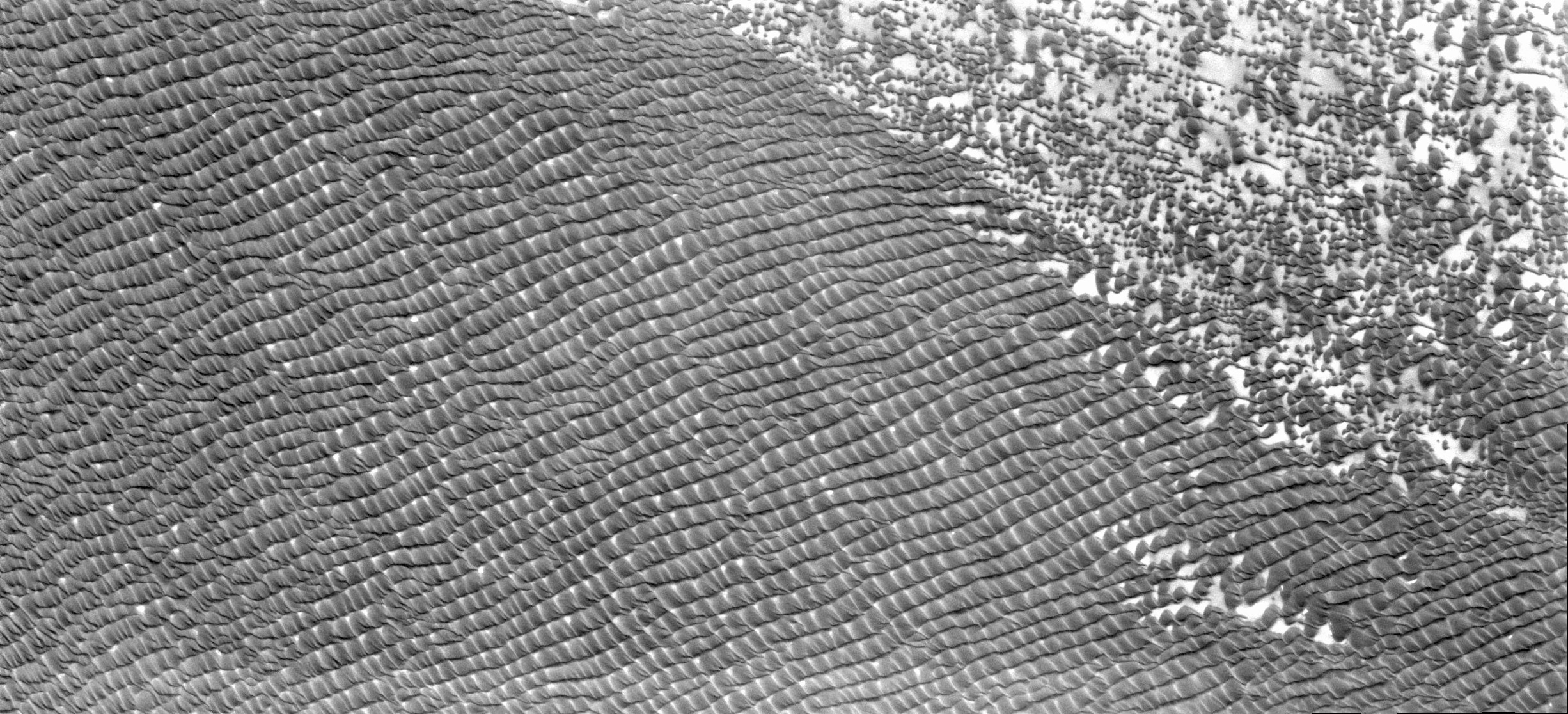
Hyperboreae Undae barchanoid and linear dunes from NASA's Thermal Emission Imaging System (THEMIS)

A third study combines images taken by the High Resolution Imaging Science Experiment (HiRISE) camera on board the Mars Reconnaissance Orbiter with the deployment of the Mars Orbiter Laser Altimeter (MOLA) to obtain local coordinates of the topography shown in the HiRISE images, and then maps the HiRISE image data into a computer simulation which registers the spatial computer model of the local topography of Hyperboreae Undae in the vicinity of Boreum Cavus. From the crestline orientation of the numerical model, the local wind vectors can be computed, and the results can then be compared to the measured wind data of the area under investigation. Conversely, if the wind vectors are known, the bedform morphology can be predicted. By comparing the numerical simulation results to measured real-world data, the computer simulation parameters can be refined, leading to better convergence between numerically-predicted and field-measured results. Limitations for the computer model include the resolution limits of the numerical model, the small area under investigation, and the complexity of the local wind conditions. The numerical study obtained results that demonstrate that Hyperboreae Undae was formed under modern wind conditions and that its form, the coexistence of barchan and linear dunes, can be established by the numerical model. Further research plans include the extension of the field of study to include modelling all of Hyperboreae Undae.

== Images from THEMIS and HiRISE ==
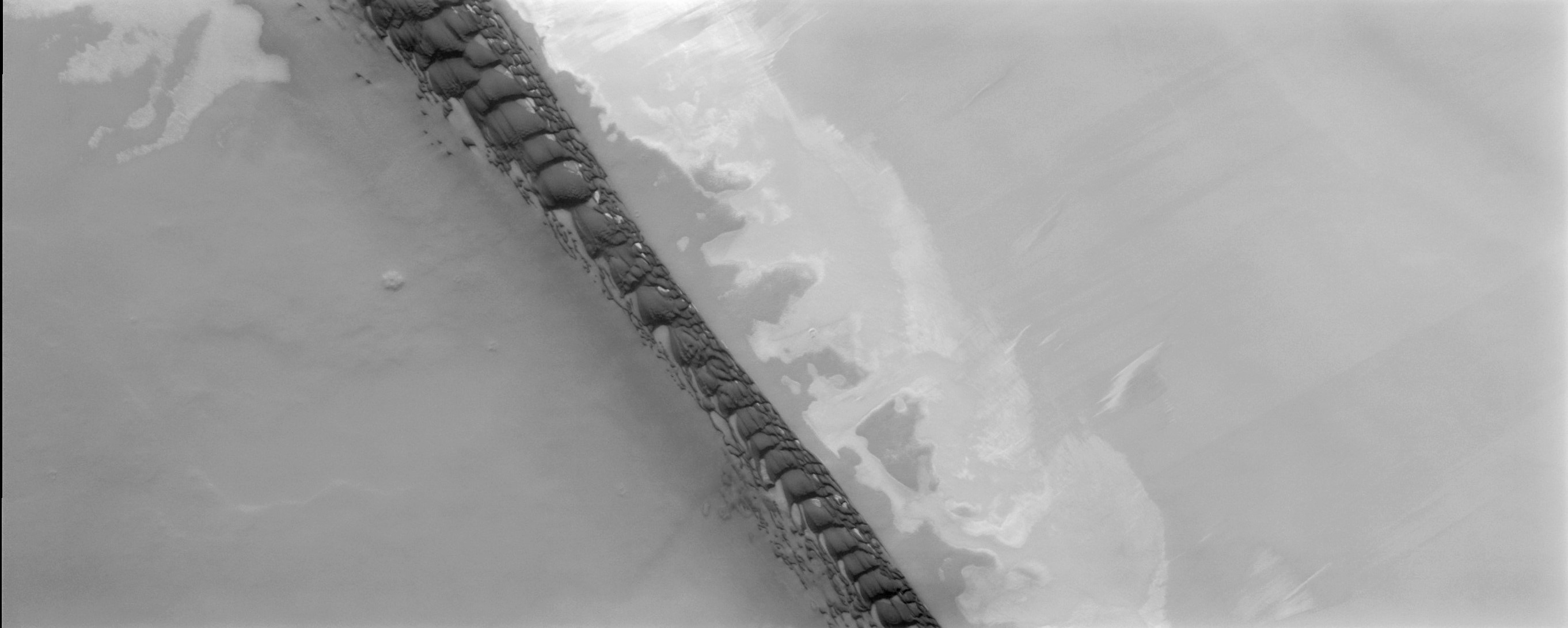
Hyperboreae Undae from NASA's Thermal Emission Imaging System (THEMIS)

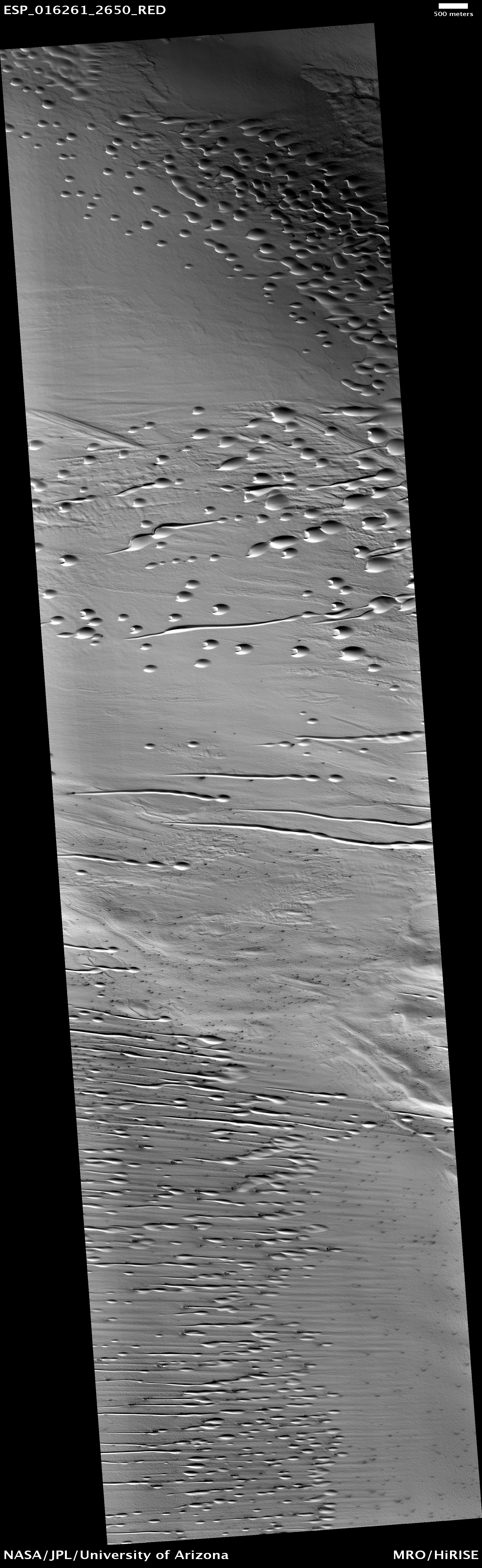
Hyperboreae Undae linear and barchanoid dunes

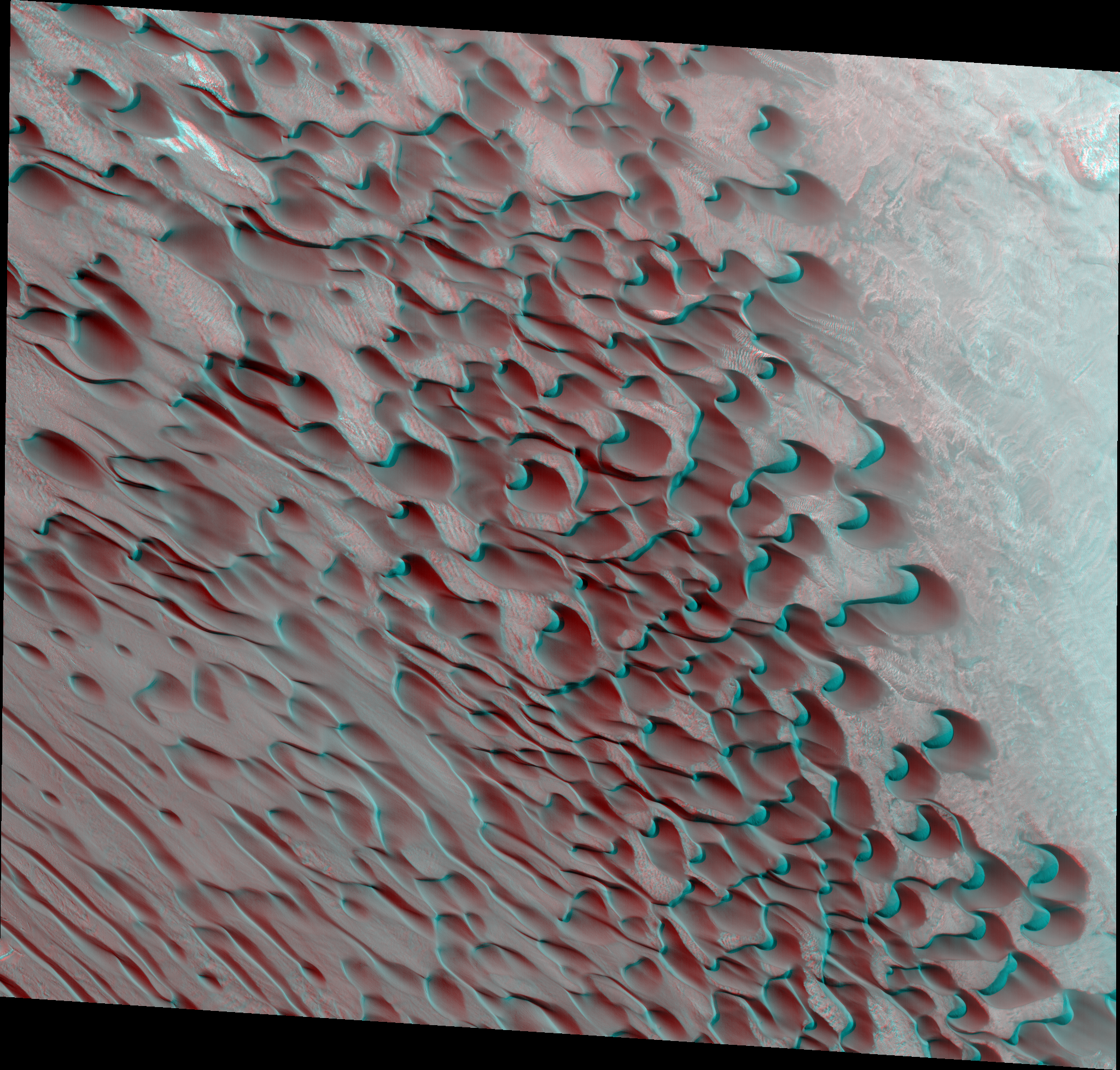
Hyperboreae Undae anaglyph 3D at the boundary with Boreum Cavus showing coexisting linear and barchan dunes

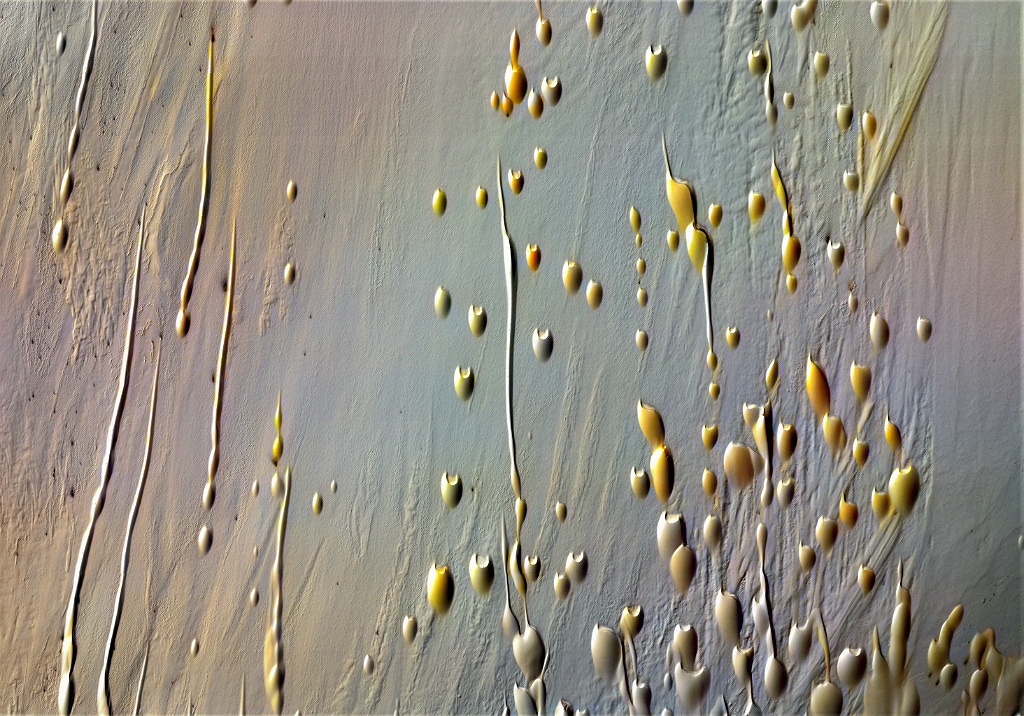

== See also ==
- Aspledon Undae
- Hagal dune field
- Nili Patera dune field
- Ogygis Undae
- Yardangs on Mars
