= Columbus (crater) =

Crater on Mars

- Columbus crater based on THEMIS day-time image
- Planet: Mars
- Coordinates: 29.8°S 166.1°W
- Quadrangle: Memnonia
- Diameter: 119 km
- Eponym: Christopher Columbus, Italian explorer (1451-1506)

Columbus is a crater in the Terra Sirenum of Mars. It is 119 km in diameter and was named after Christopher Columbus, Italian explorer (1451–1506). The discovery of sulfates and clay minerals in sediments within Columbus crater are strong evidence that a lake once existed in the crater. Research with an orbiting near-infrared spectrometer, which reveals the types of minerals present based on the wavelengths of light they absorb, found evidence of layers of both clay and sulfates in Columbus crater. This is exactly what would appear if a large lake had slowly evaporated. Moreover, because some layers contained gypsum, a sulfate which forms in relatively fresh water, life could have formed in the crater.

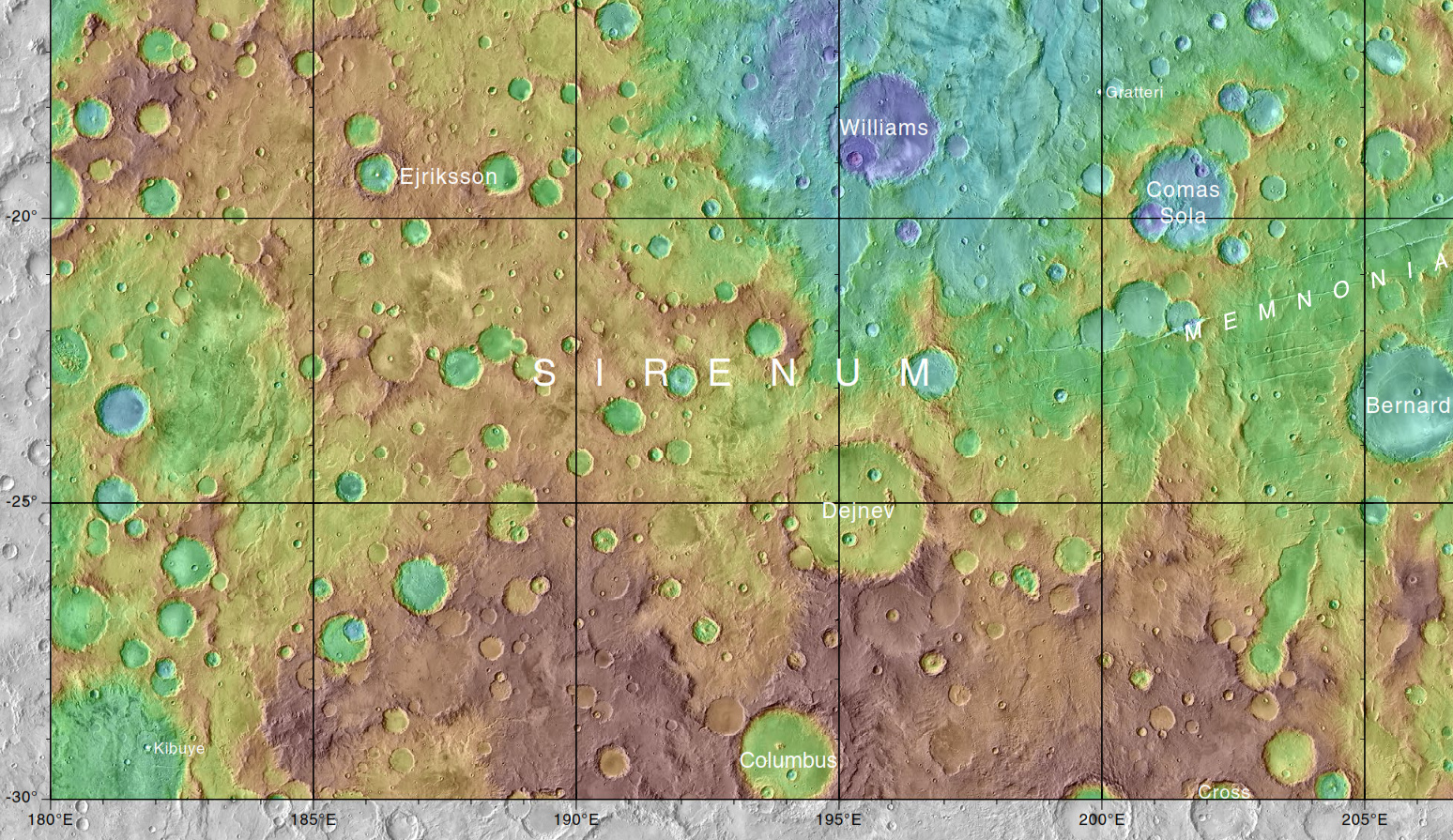
Map showing the relative positions of Columbus crater and other nearby craters in Memnonia quadrangle

== Layers ==
Columbus crater contains layers, also called strata. In Columbus crater, the CRISM instrument on the Mars Reconnaissance Orbiter found kaolinite, hydrated sulfates including alunite and possibly jarosite. Further study concluded that gypsum, polyhydrated and monohydrated Mg/Fe-sulfates were common and small deposits of montmorillonite, Fe/Mg-phyllosilicates, and crystalline ferric oxide or hydroxide were found. Thermal emission spectra suggest that some minerals were in the tens of percent range.

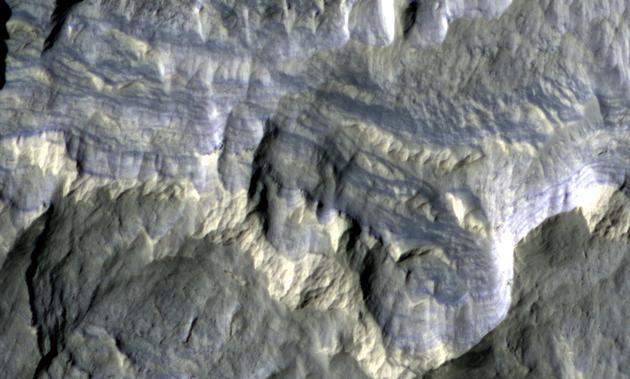
Columbus crater layers, as seen by HiRISE. This false-color image is about 800 feet across. Some of the layers contain hydrated minerals.

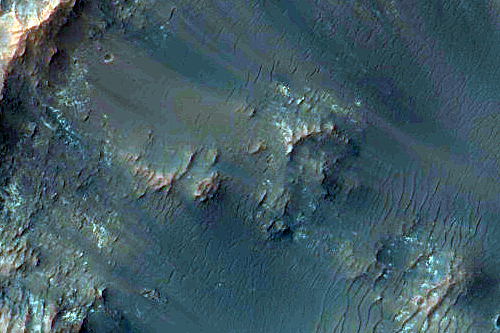
Close-up of Columbus crater, as seen by HiRISE

== See also ==
- Groundwater on Mars
- Geology of Mars
- HiRISE
- Lakes on Mars
- List of craters on Mars
- List of quadrangles on Mars
- Geological history of Mars
- Water on Mars
