= Memnonia quadrangle =

Map of Mars

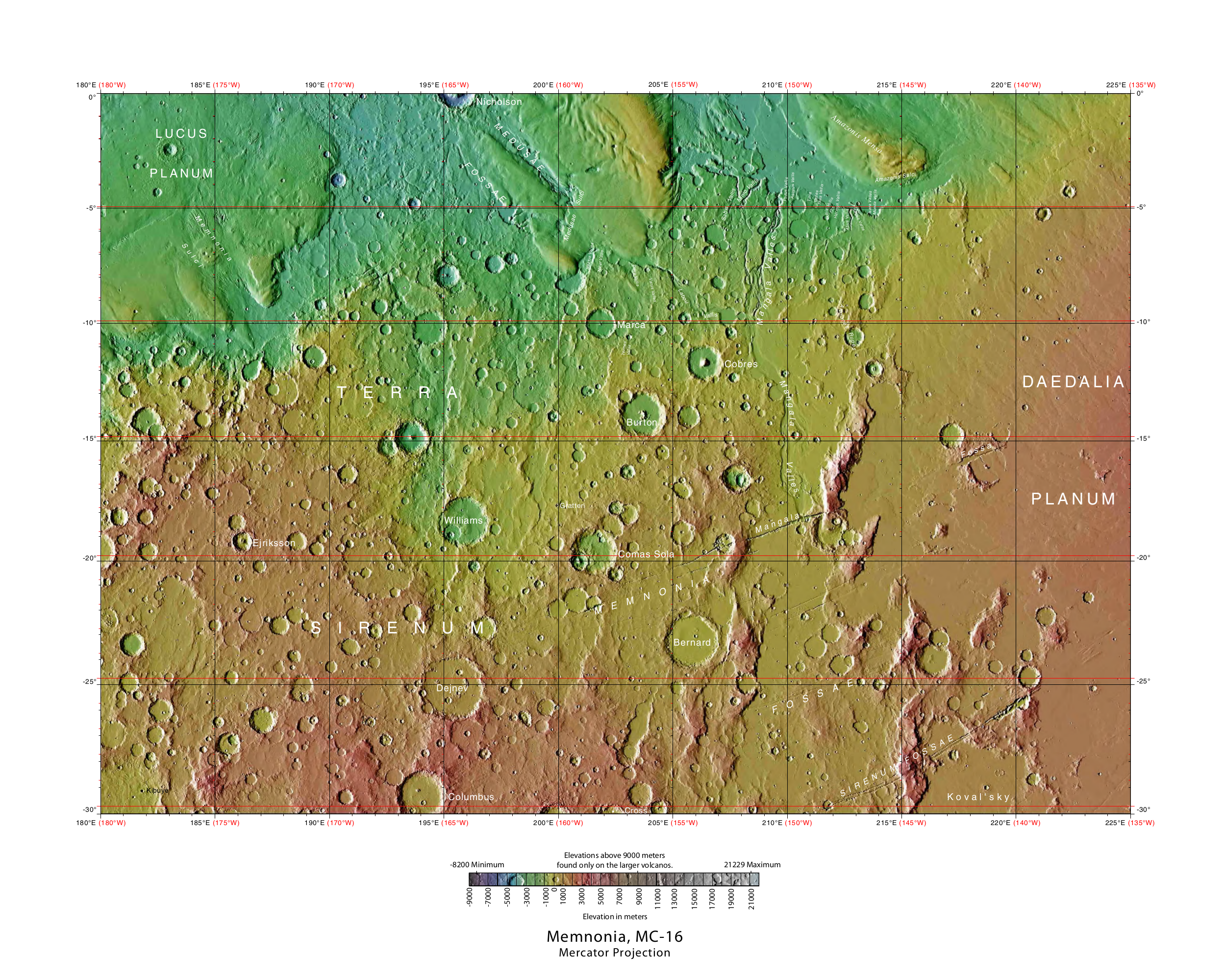
- Elevation map of Memnonia quadrangle from Mars Orbiter Laser Altimeter (MOLA) data.
- Coordinates: 15°S 157.5°W

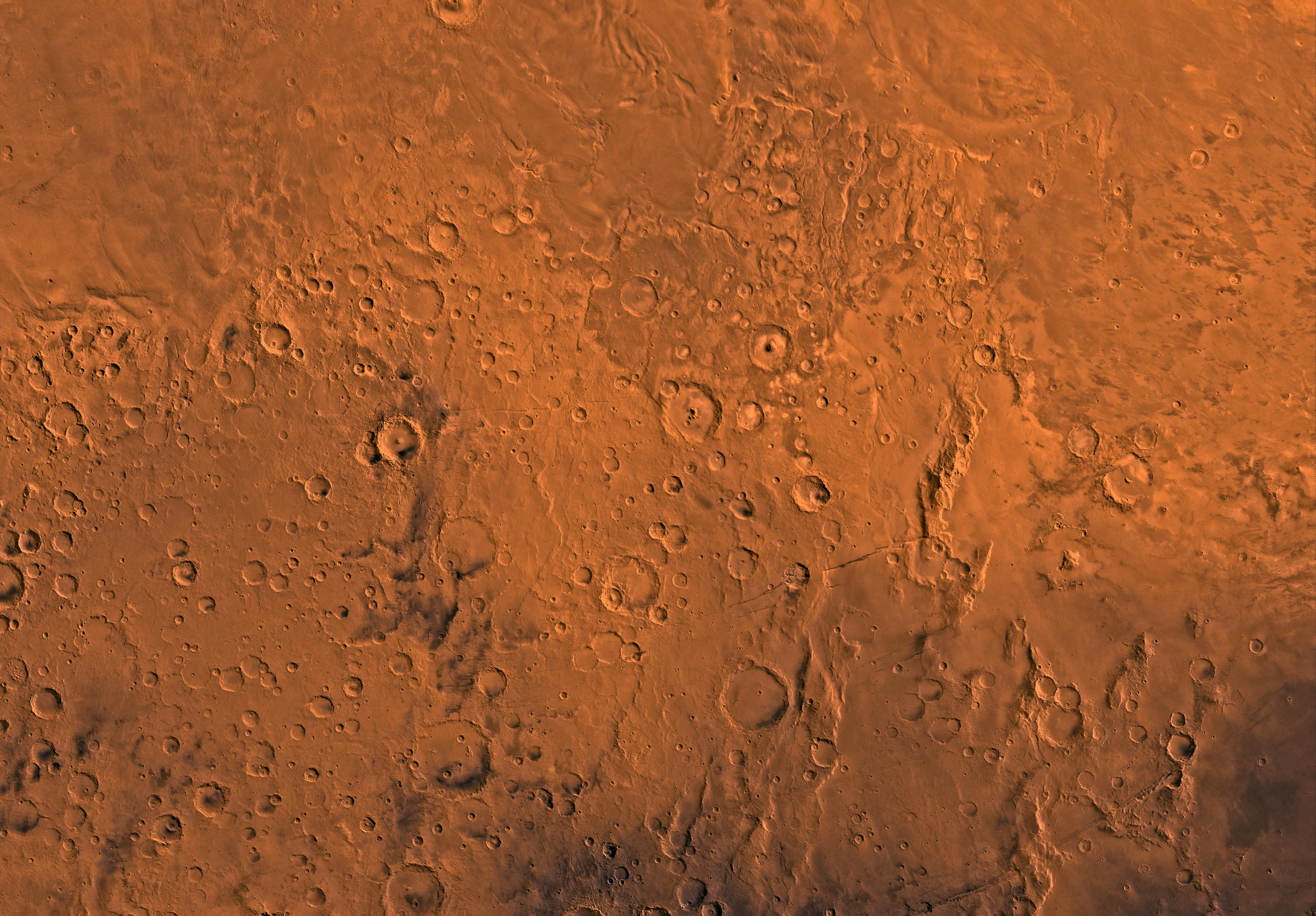
Image of the Memnonia Quadrangle (MC-16). The south includes heavily cratered highlands intersected, in the northeastern part, by Mangala Vallis. The north contains undulating wind-eroded deposits and the east contains lava flows from the Tharsis region.

The Memnonia quadrangle is one of a series of 30 quadrangle maps of Mars used by the United States Geological Survey (USGS) Astrogeology Research Program. The Memnonia quadrangle is also referred to as MC-16 (Mars Chart-16).

The quadrangle is a region of Mars that covers latitude -30° to 0° and longitude 135° to 180°. The western part of Memnonia is a highly cratered highland region that exhibits a large range of crater degradation.

Memnonia includes the Arcadia Planitia, Amazonis Planitia, Lucus Planum, Terra Sirenum, Daedalia Planum, and Terra Cimmeria regions.

Many ancient river valleys including Mangala Vallis, have been found in the Memnonia quadrangle. Mangala appears to have begun with the formation of a graben, a set of faults that may have exposed an aquifer.

== Layers ==
Columbus Crater contains layers, also called strata. Many places on Mars show rocks arranged in layers. Sometimes the layers are of different colors. Light-toned rocks on Mars have been associated with hydrated minerals like sulfates. The Mars rover Opportunity examined such layers close-up with several instruments. Some layers are probably made up of fine particles because they seem to break up into fine dust. Other layers break up into large boulders so they are probably much harder. Basalt, a volcanic rock, is thought to in the layers that form boulders. Basalt has been identified on Mars in many places. Instruments on orbiting spacecraft have detected clay (also called phyllosilicate) in some layers. Recent research with an orbiting near-infrared spectrometer, which reveals the types of minerals present based on the wavelengths of light they absorb, found evidence of layers of both clay and sulfates in Columbus crater. This is exactly what would appear if a large lake had slowly evaporated. Moreover, because some layers contained gypsum, a sulfate which forms in relatively fresh water, life could have formed in the crater.

Scientists are excited about finding hydrated minerals such as sulfates and clays on Mars because they are usually formed in the presence of water. Places that contain clays and/or other hydrated minerals would be good places to look for evidence of life.

Rock can form layers in a variety of ways. Volcanoes, wind, or water can produce layers.

== Mangala Vallis ==
Mangala Vallis is a major channel system that contains several basins which filled, then the overflow went through a series of spillways. One source of waters for the system was Memonia Fossae, but water also probably came from a large basin centered at 40° S.

== See also ==
- Climate of Mars
- Dark slope streaks
- Fossa (geology)
- Geology of Mars
- Groundwater on Mars
- HiRISE
- High Resolution Stereo Camera - HRSC
- HiWish program
- Impact crater
- Lakes on Mars
- List of quadrangles on Mars
- Linear ridge networks
- Lucus Planum
- Mariner 4
- Mars Express
- Mars Global Surveyor
- Mars Orbiter Camera
- Mars Orbiter Mission
- 2001 Mars Odyssey
- MAVEN
- Thermal Emission Imaging System- THEMIS
- Viking program
- Vallis
- Valley networks (Mars)
- Water on Mars
- Yardang
- Yardangs on Mars

MC-01 Mare Boreum (features)
MC-02 Diacria (features)		MC-03 Arcadia (features)	MC-04 Acidalium (features)	MC-05 Ismenius Lacus (features)		MC-06 Casius (features)	MC-07 Cebrenia (features)
MC-08 Amazonis (features)	MC-09 Tharsis (features)	MC-10 Lunae Palus (features)	MC-11 Oxia Palus (features)	MC-12 Arabia (features)	MC-13 Syrtis Major (features)	MC-14 Amenthes (features)	MC-15 Elysium (features)
MC-16 Memnonia (features)	MC-17 Phoenicis Lacus (features)	MC-18 Coprates (features)	MC-19 Margaritifer Sinus (features)	MC-20 Sinus Sabaeus (features)	MC-21 Iapygia (features)	MC-22 Mare Tyrrhenum (features)	MC-23 Aeolis (features)
MC-24 Phaethontis (features)		MC-25 Thaumasia (features)	MC-26 Argyre (features)	MC-27 Noachis (features)		MC-28 Hellas (features)	MC-29 Eridania (features)
MC-30 Mare Australe (features)
