= Apollinaris Mons =

Martian shield volcano

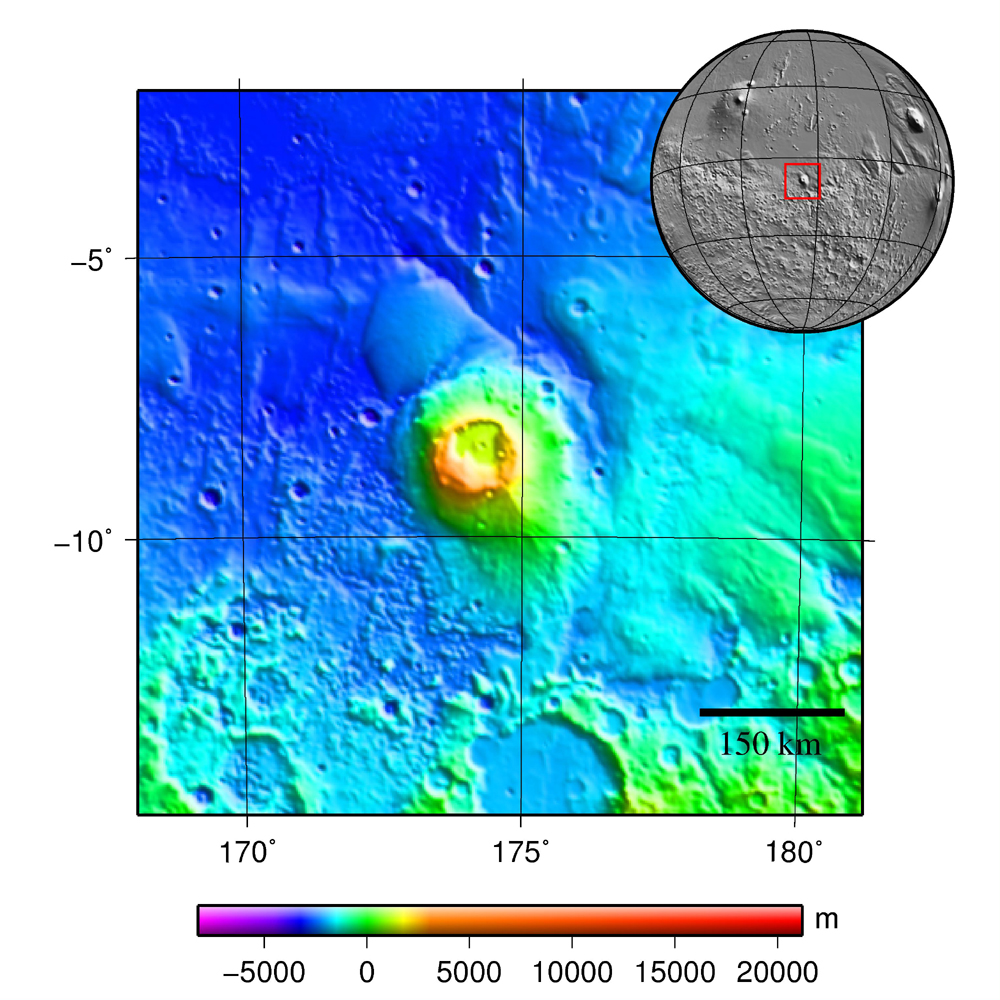
- Topography map of Apollinaris Mons
- Feature type: Shield volcano
- Coordinates: 9.3°S 174.4°E

Apollinaris Mons is an ancient shield volcano in the southern hemisphere of Mars. It is situated near the equator, south of Elysium Planitia and north of the impact crater Gusev (the landing site of the Mars rover Spirit). Elysium Planitia separates it from the volcanic province of Elysium to its northwest. The volcano's caldera is named Apollinaris Patera; this name formerly applied to the whole edifice.

Apollinaris Mons is about 5 kilometres high with a base about 296 kilometres in diameter. On the top of this volcano is a caldera about 80 km (50 miles) in diameter. The volcano is approximately 3 billion to 3.5 billion years old.

It was named in 1973 after a mountain spring near Rome in Italy.

A study using a global climate model found that the Medusae Fossae Formation could have been formed from ash from Apollinaris Mons, Arsia Mons, and possibly Pavonis Mons.

== Paleomagnetic field studies ==
Apollinaris Patera parallels many of the volcanic terrains on Mars, including most of the Elysium and Tharsis Rises, in that they are demagnetized terrains that conspicuously predate the shutdown of the Martian dynamo. The mechanism of its deactivation has been compared to that of Hadriacus Mons. Researchers observing this noted that the deposition of lavas atop an older, more magnetized terrain might have led to the region's demagnetization. Its existence thus does not challenge hypotheses about the timing of the dynamo shutdown.

== Gallery ==
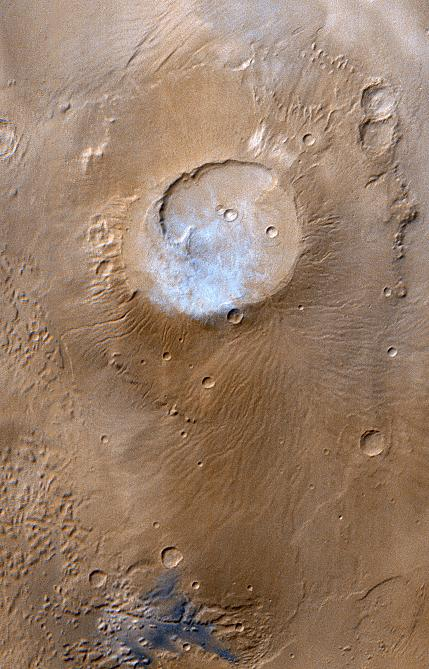
False-color Mars Global Surveyor image of Apollinaris Mons. White clouds can be seen hovering above the volcano.

== See also ==
- Geography of Mars
- List of mountains on Mars by height
- Medusae Fossae Formation
