= Yardangs on Mars =

Aeolian formation

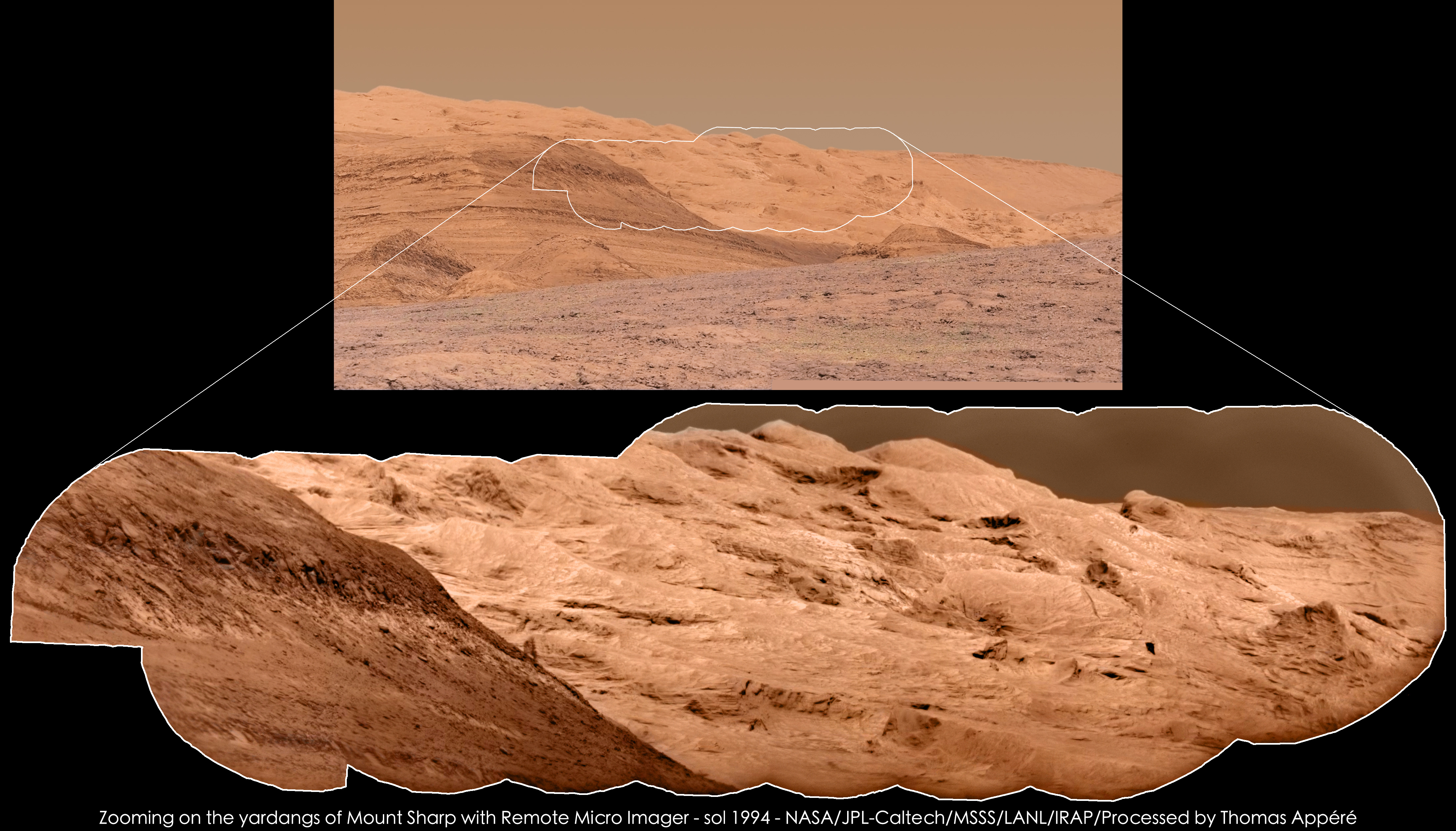
Zooming on the yardangs of Mount Sharp with Remote Micro Imager on the Curiosity rover - sol 1994

Yardangs are common in some regions on Mars, especially in the Medusae Fossae Formation. This formation is found in the Amazonis quadrangle and near the equator. They are formed by the action of wind on sand sized particles; hence they often point in the prevailing direction that the winds were blowing when they were formed. Yardangs exhibit very few impact craters, indicating that the surface exposed is relatively young and the process of erosion may be active. The easily eroded nature of the Medusae Fossae Formation suggests that it is composed of weakly cemented particles, and was most likely formed by the deposition of wind-blown dust or volcanic ash. Yardangs are parts of rock that have been sand blasted into long, skinny ridges by bouncing sand particles blowing in the wind. Layers are seen in parts of the formation. A resistant caprock on the top of yardangs has been observed in Viking, Mars Global Surveyor, and HiRISE photos. Images from spacecraft show that they have different degrees of hardness probably because of significant variations in the physical properties, composition, particle size, and/or cementation.

== Gallery ==
Medusae Fossae Formation as seen with Mars Odyssey's THEMIS. Notice elongated formations called yardangs.

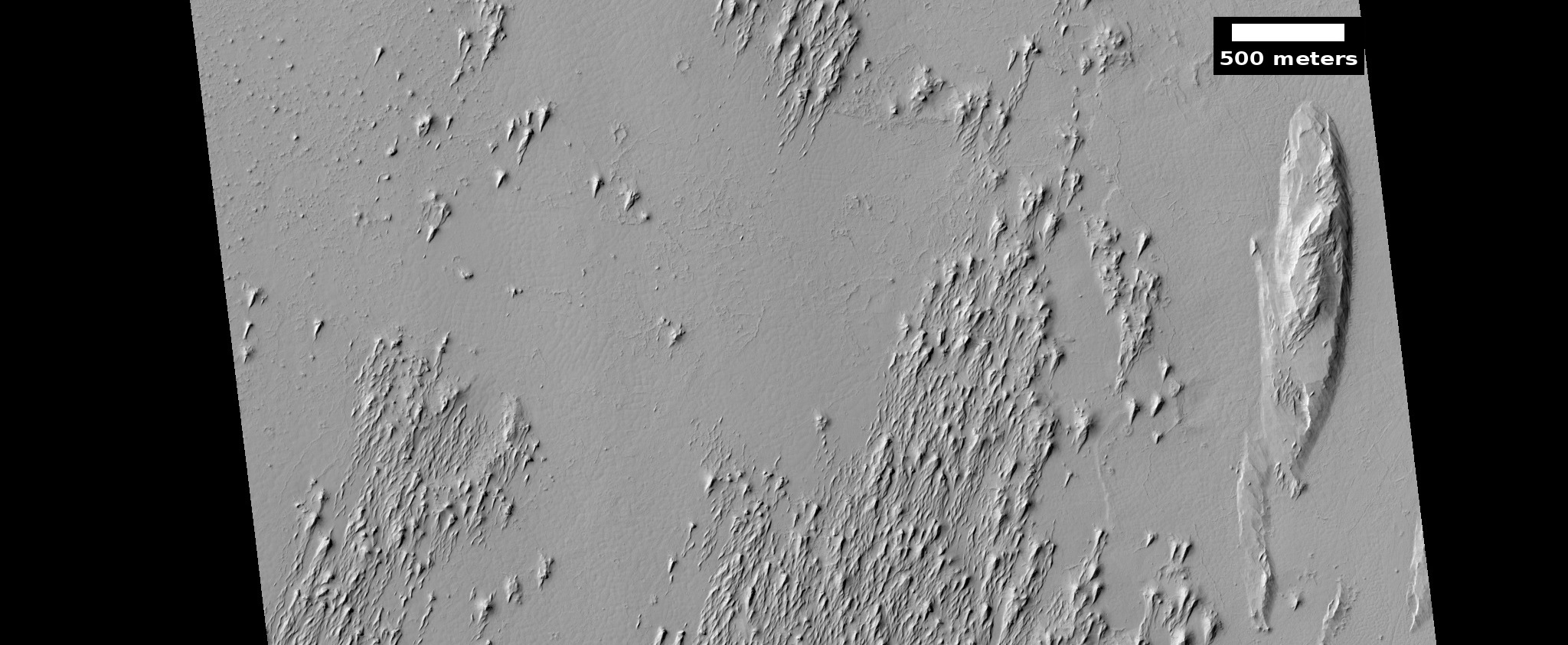
Yardangs of various sizes, as seen by HiRISE under HiWish program.

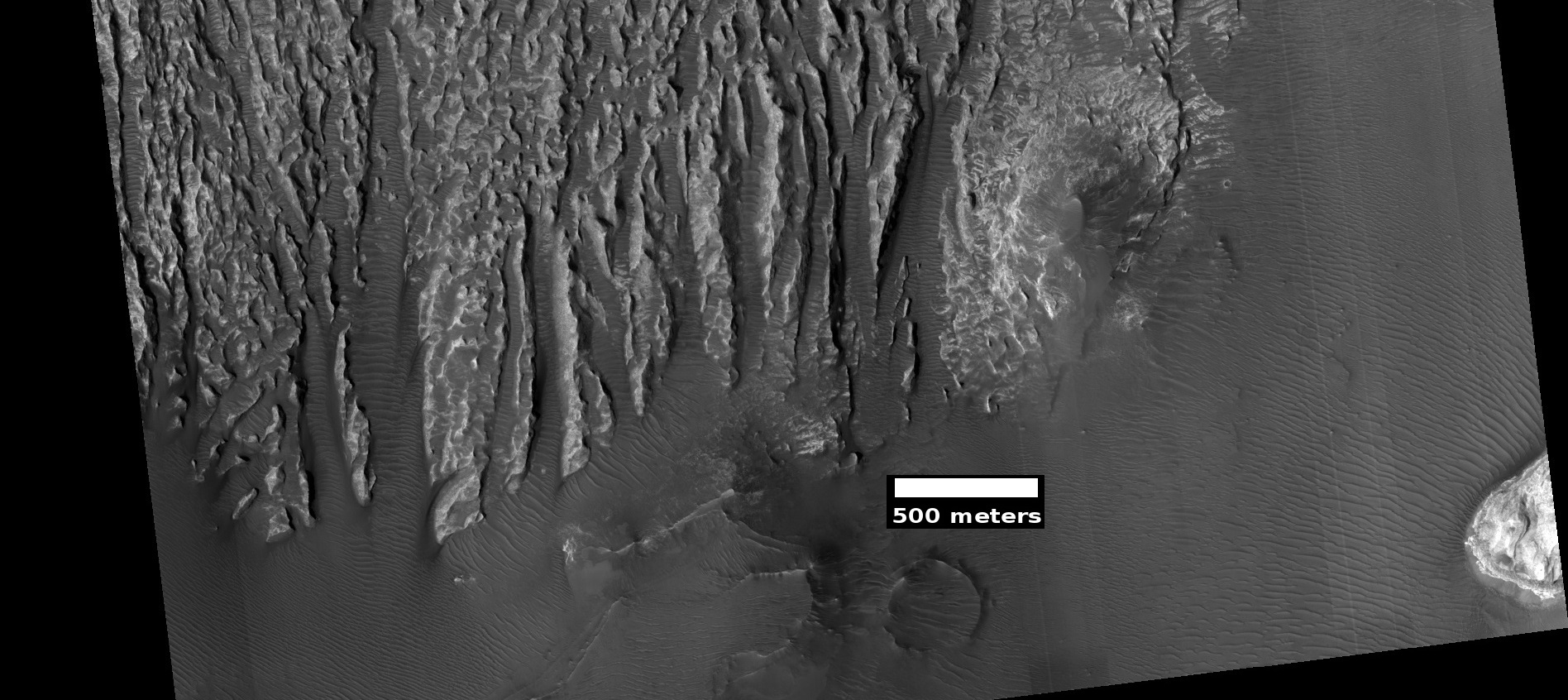
Yardangs formed in light-toned material and surrounded by dark, volcanic basalt sand, as seen by HiRISE under HiWish program.

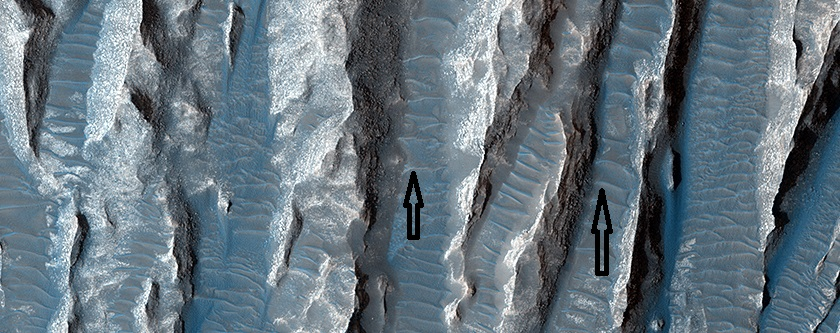
Close-up image of yardangs, as seen by HiRISE under HiWish program. Arrows point to transverse aeolian ridges, a type of dune..

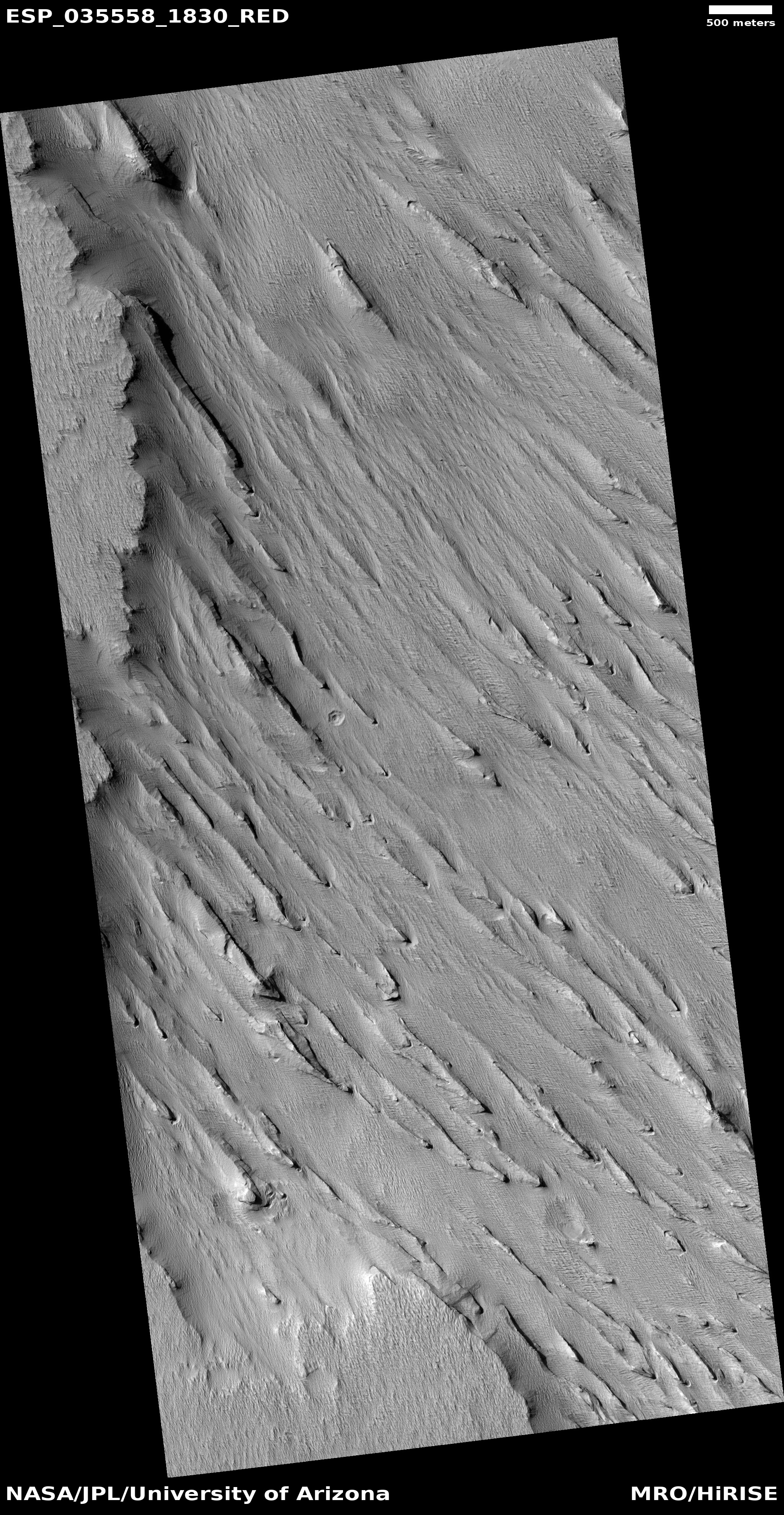
Yardangs, as seen by HiRISE under HiWish program Location is near Gordii Dorsum in the Amazonis quadrangle. These yardangs are in the upper member of the Medusae Fossae Formation,

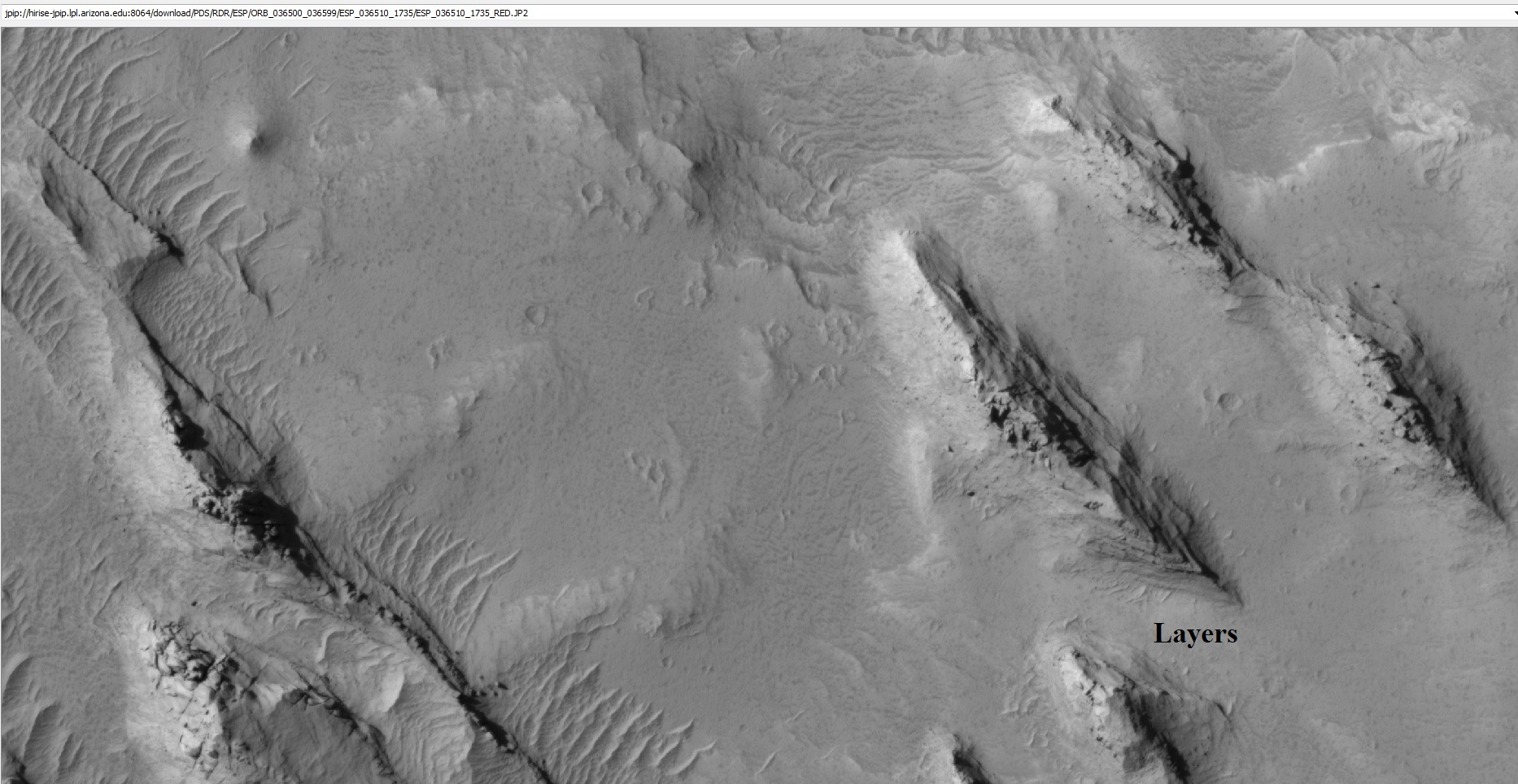
Yardangs showing layers, as seen by HiRISE under HiWish program Location is Aeolis quadrangle.

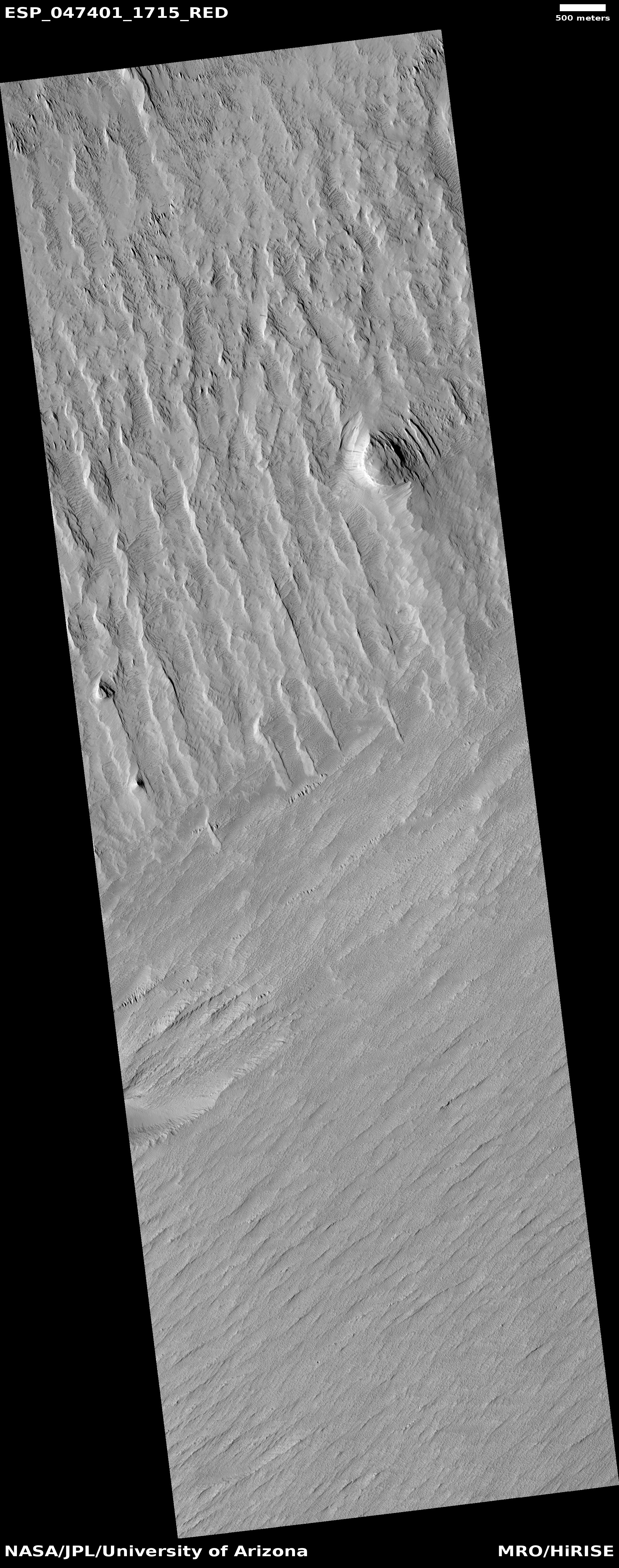
Wide view of yardangs, as seen by HiRISE under HiWish program This image is odd in that the yardangs are lined up in different directions in the top and bottom part of image. The wind direction probably changed to cause this. Location is Memnonia quadrangle.

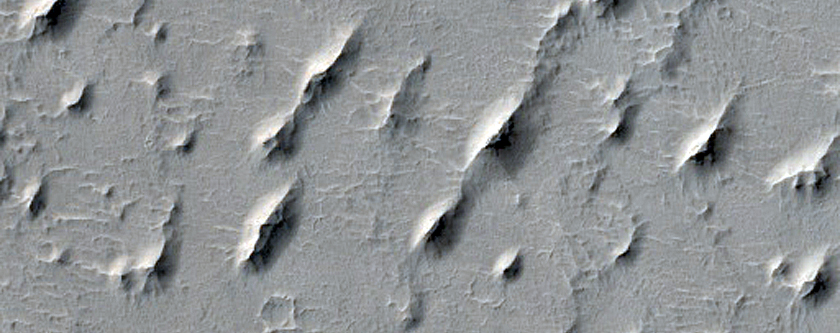
Close view of yardangs in Arabia quadrangle These features are shaped by the wind.

== See also ==
- Climate of Mars
- Geology of Mars
- Yardang
- Hyperboreae Undae
