= Yardang =

Streamlined aeolian landform

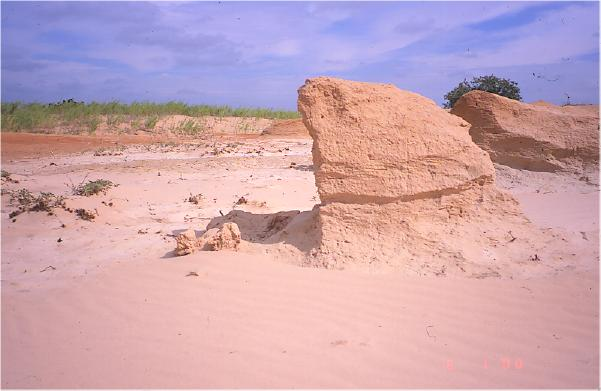
A yardang near Meadow, Texas (33.321°N 102.495°W) (USDA photo).

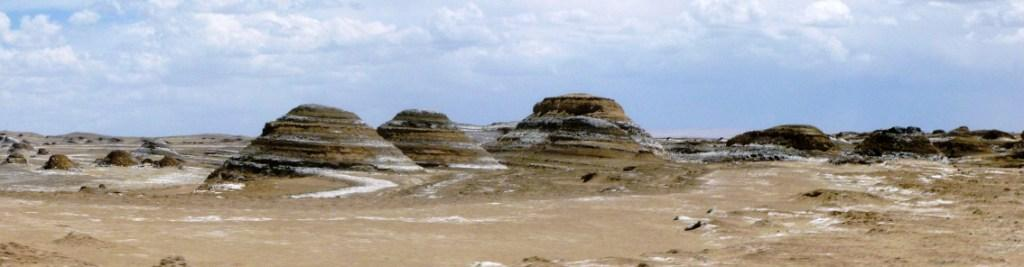
Yardangs in the Qaidam Desert, Qinghai Province, China.

A yardang is a streamlined protuberance carved from bedrock or any consolidated or semiconsolidated material by the dual action of wind abrasion by dust and sand and deflation (the removal of loose material by wind turbulence). Yardangs become elongated features typically three or more times longer than wide, and when viewed from above, resemble the hull of a boat. Facing the wind is a steep, blunt face that gradually gets lower and narrower toward the lee end. Yardangs are formed by wind erosion, typically of an originally flat surface formed from areas of harder and softer material. The soft material is eroded and removed by the wind, and the harder material remains. The resulting pattern of yardangs is therefore a combination of the original rock distribution, and the fluid mechanics of the air flow and resulting pattern of erosion.

== Names ==
The word itself is of Turkic origin, meaning 'steep bank', as this type of spectacular landscapes rising 25–50 feet (8–15 m) are best developed in the interior deserts of this region. And the word was first introduced to the English-speaking world by the Swedish explorer Sven Hedin in 1903. In China, they are sometimes known as yadan from the Chinese adaptation of the Uyghur form of the same name.

Other names for them are "mud-lions", "mushroom rocks", "sphinx-like hills", "koukour" in Tunisia, and "kalut" (Persian for "ridge") in Iran. The massive features of mega-yardangs are called "ridges and corridors" (crêtes et couloirs) in French.

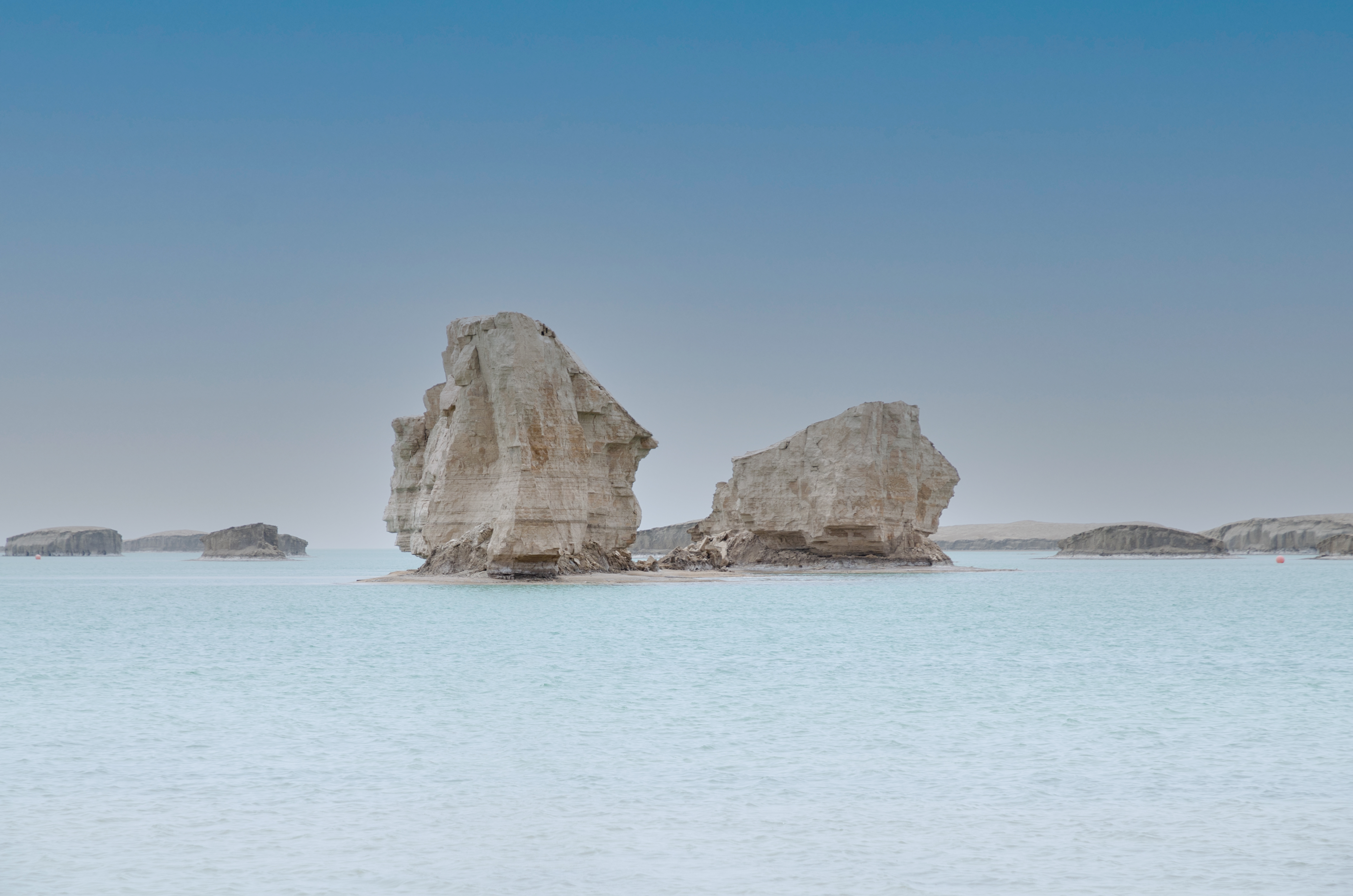
Yardangs on water in the Usut Yardang Geological Park, Qinghai, China

== Description ==
A yardang is formed in cohesive material. Hedin first found the wind-sculptured "clay terraces" or yardangs in the dried up riverbed of the Kurruk-daria in Central Asia. However, yardangs can be found in most deserts across the globe. Depending upon the winds and the composition of the weakly indurated deposits of silt and sand from which they are carved, yardangs may form very unusual shapes — some resemble various objects, people or even lying lions.

Yardangs come in a large range of sizes, and are divided into three different categories: mega-yardangs, meso-yardangs, and micro-yardangs. Mega-yardangs can be several kilometers long and hundreds of meters high and are found in arid regions with strong winds; meso-yardangs are generally a few meters high and 10 to 15 meters long and are commonly found carved in semiconsolidated playa sediments and other soft granular materials; and micro-yardangs are only a few centimeters high.

A large concentration of mega-yardangs occurs near the Tibesti Mountains in the central Sahara. There is a famous yardang at Hole in the Rock in Papago Park in Phoenix, Arizona, a rock formation with a roughly circular hole in it. Another yardang in Arizona is Window Rock, near the town of Window Rock. It is a 60-meter sandstone hill with a very large circular hole in the middle of it. Some geologists have suggested that the Great Sphinx of Egypt is an augmented yardang.

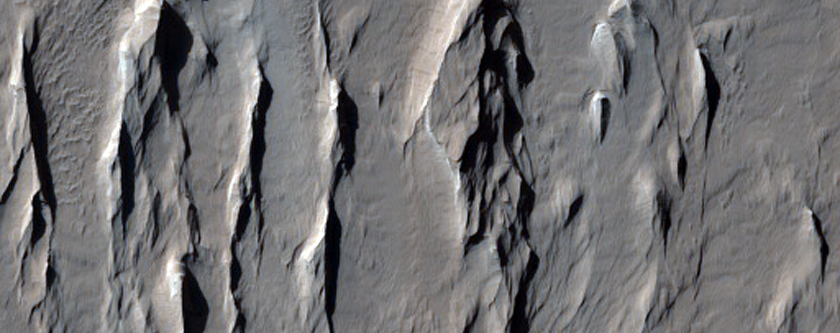
Yardangs in Lucus Planum (Mars)

Pictures from Mars show that the yardang ridges occur on a massive scale there; some individual ridges are tens of kilometers long with intervening valleys nearly 1 km wide. Yardangs on Mars are typically found in the Amazonis region but the best ones are found in the equatorial region. Yardangs on Mars demonstrate that much of the eolian erosion is recent since they are sculpted in young geologic units.

== Formation ==
Explaining the formation of yardangs is challenging. It occurs due to the coupled evolution of complex flow fields and three-dimensional (3D) topographies in the context of harder or less erodible material embedded in softer material. The carving of the geometrical features is generated by differential erosion caused by flow strength, flow funneling, and turbulent wakes.

Yardangs are formed in environments where water is scarce and the prevailing winds are strong, uni-directional, and carry an abrasive sediment load. The wind cuts down low-lying areas into parallel ridges which gradually erode into separate hills that take on the unique shape of a yardang. This process yields a field of yardangs of roughly the same size, commonly referred to as a fleet due to their resemblance to the bottoms of ships. Alternatively, one can be formed by the migration of a dune that leaves behind a cemented core. As the process of formation continues, typically a trough will form around the base of the yardang. Most yardang fields are in sand-poor areas, but the associated troughs, especially in grooved terrain, may be invaded by sand. Sometimes this sand will accumulate to build shallow moats around the bottom.

They are more commonly created from softer rock types like siltstone, sandstone, tuff or Ignimbrite, shale, and limestone, but have also been observed in crystalline rocks such as schist and gneiss.

== See also ==
- Aeolian processes – Processes due to wind activity
- Barchan – Crescent-shaped dune
- Blowout – Depressions in a sand dune ecosystem caused by the removal of sediments by wind
- Dune – Hill of loose sand built by aeolian processes or the flow of water
- Dunhuang Yardang National Geopark – Protected area in Gansu Province, China
- Hoodoo (geology) – Tall, thin spire of relatively soft rock usually topped by harder rock
- Lop Desert – Desert in China
- Mushroom rock – Mushroom-shaped rock formation
- Saltation – Particle transport by fluids
- Sandhill – Type of ecological community or xeric wildfire-maintained ecosystem
- Ventifact – Rock that has been eroded by wind-driven sand or ice crystals
