= Impact events on Mars =

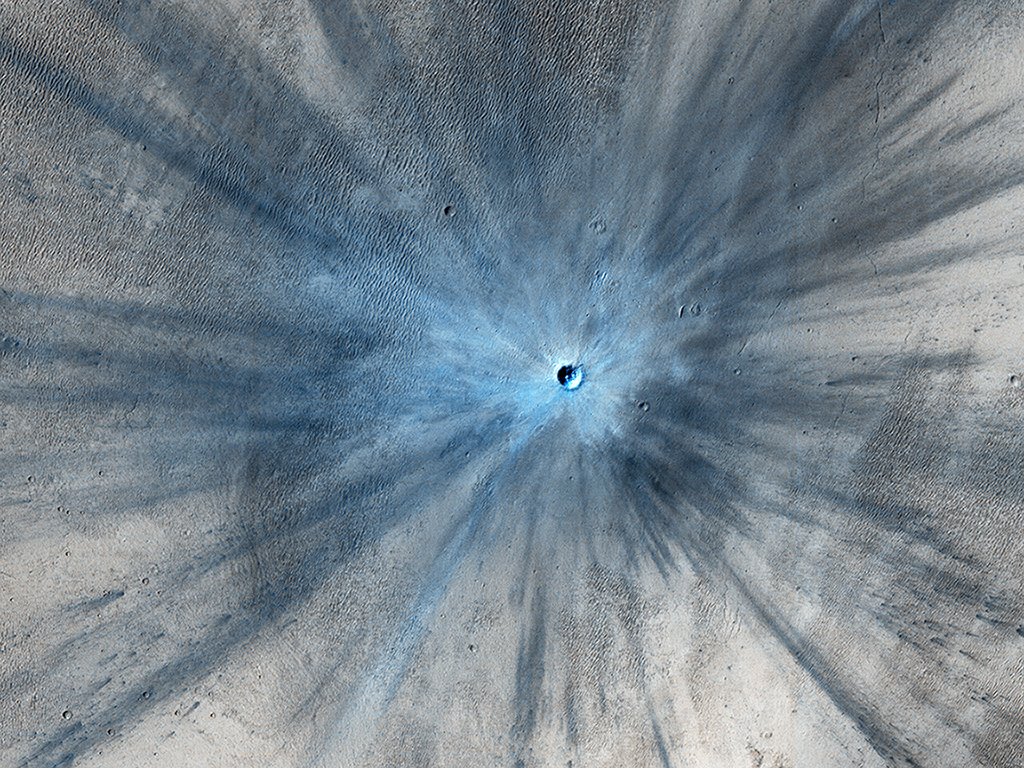
Mars Reconnaissance Orbiter image of a newly-formed Martian impact crater at Solis Planum in 2013. This crater spans 30 meters (98 ft) in diameter and is surrounded by dark ejecta rays extending up to 15 kilometers (9.3 mi).

In modern times, numerous impact events on Mars have been detected. Although most have been inferred from the appearance of new impact craters on the planet, some have corresponded to marsquakes felt by the InSight lander. To date, no impacting meteors have been directly observed as a fireball or discovered in space before impact.

== Overview ==
As the best-explored planet in the Solar System (after Earth), Mars has been continuously explored by various spacecraft, landers, and rovers since 1997. The first probe to image Mars's surface in detail was Mariner 4 in 1965, and Mariner 9 became the first probe to orbit Mars in 1971. However, few early probes were able to image Mars in high enough resolution to detect new impact craters, which are typically less than 10 meters (33 ft) across. Early probes reached resolutions of 790 meters (2,590 ft), while Mariner 9 was able to reach 98 meters (322 ft). From 1976 to 1982, Viking 1 and Viking 2 imaged all of Mars at 150 meters (490 ft) resolution, with some areas imaged in up to 8 meters (26 ft) resolution.

The Mars Global Surveyor, active from 1997 to 2006, was the first spacecraft able to image Mars in high enough resolution to detect new impacts, with a resolution of up to 1.5 meters (4.9 ft). The first detected impact, a 14.4-meter (47 ft)-diameter crater in southern Lucus Planum, happened between 27 January 2000, and 19 March 2001. Since then, over 1,200 new impact craters have been found on Mars with 2001 Mars Odyssey, Mars Express, and Mars Reconnaissance Orbiter, over 1,100 of which were found by the last.

Unlike on Earth, most impact craters on Mars come in clusters, caused by the meteor partially fragmenting before impact. Due to Mars's tenuous atmosphere, with just 0.6% the surface pressure of Earth's, incoming meteors are much less prone to breaking up. while a 10-meter (33 ft) asteroid falling over Earth is unlikely to reach the surface intact before being destroyed in a meteor air burst, a 10-meter (33 ft) asteroid falling over Mars may leave a crater over 100 meters (330 ft) across, or several smaller craters tens of meters across.

There is significant observation bias in the locations of discovered impact craters: certain locations on Mars are of much more geological interest, and so are imaged more frequently and in detail than less notable ones. Additionally, many new craters are first noticed by their 'blast zone' of ejecta, which can be 10-100 times the size of the crater itself. However, only certain regions of Mars have subsurface material that can be ejected to create these features; in particular, the Tharsis rise, Olympus Mons, Elysium Mons, and Arabia Terra. As a result, very few impacts have been detected outside of these regions, despite impacts in theory happening randomly across the planet.

Despite these biases, the existing observations of new Martian impacts suggest that asteroids of a given size impacting the planet are about 3 times more common than on Earth and the Moon, with roughly 240 4-meter (13 ft) craters and one to seven 30-meter (98 ft) craters forming each year (compared to the observed ~0.8). Larger impactors also seem to be more relatively frequent than on Earth or the Moon (i.e. the size-frequency distribution slope is shallower). If this holds true for larger asteroid sizes, this suggests that Mars may be in a modern impact surge, although atmospheric deceleration of small asteroids might explain the unexpectedly shallow slope, which would become more consistent with predictions for larger asteroids.

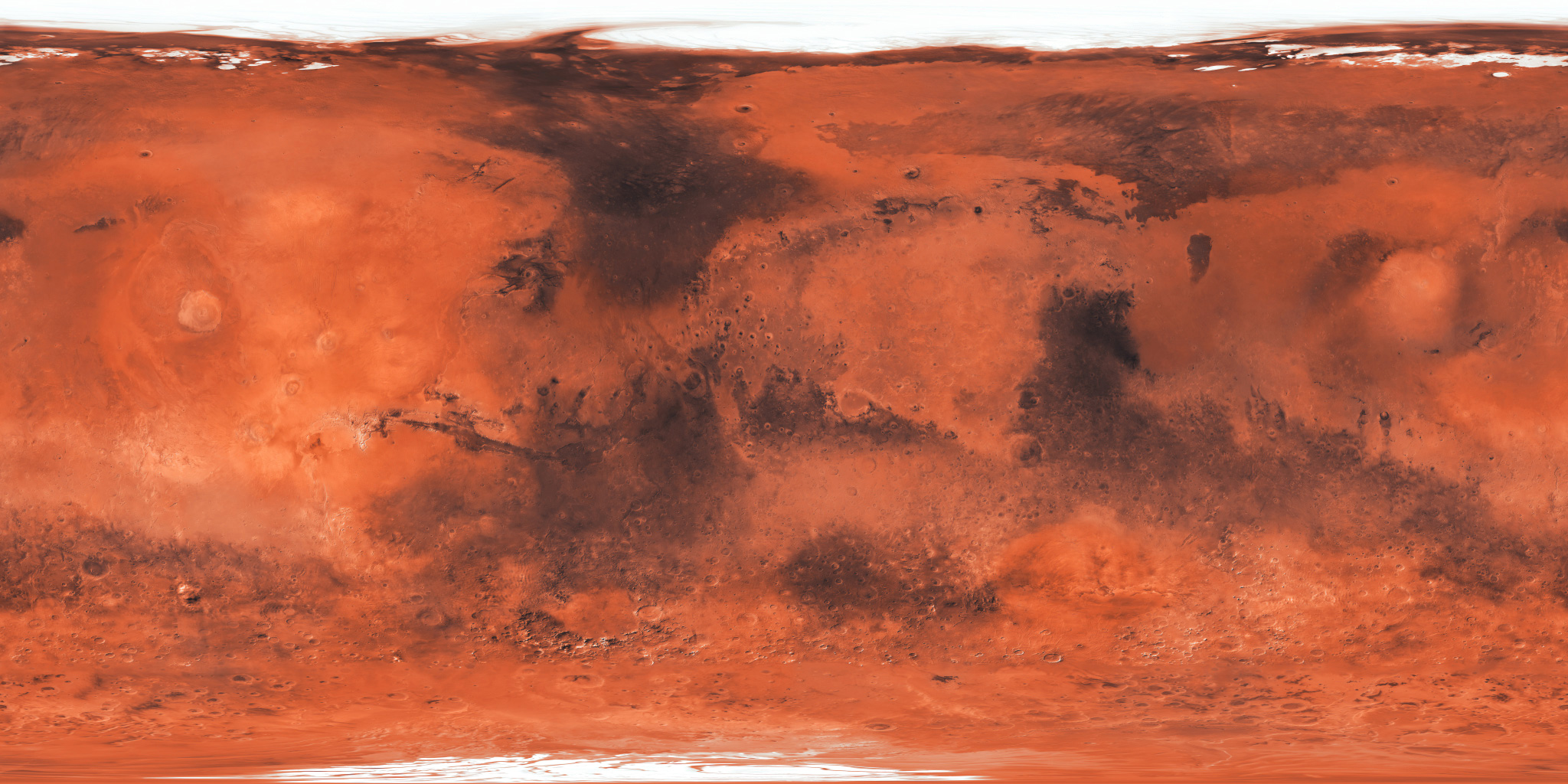
Map of detected impacts on Mars. Green are notable <15-meter (49 ft) craters, yellow are 15–20-meter (49–66 ft) craters, orange are 20–50-meter (66–164 ft) craters, red are 50–100-meter (160–330 ft) craters, and purple are >100-meter (330 ft) craters.

== List of notable impacts ==
The following is a list of detected impact events with a crater size of >15 meters, which excludes most meteoroid impacts (<1 meter asteroids). 10-15 meter craters discovered before 2010 are also included, before the rate of discovering such craters became dozens per year.

Date			Details				Discovery		Location			Notes
Discovery date	Median impact date (Note: As the exact impact date isn't known for most craters, the date provided here is midway between the last pre-impact image and the discovery image.)	Uncertainty (days)	Crater diameter (m)	Impactor diameter (m) (Note: Assuming a meteor velocity of 5-15 km/s, an impact angle of 45°, and a density of 1-3 g/cm^{3})	Impactor mass (tonnes)	Ice-exposing?	Discovery spacecraft	Reference spacecraft	quadrangle	Region	Coordinates	Notes
2001-03-19	2000-08-22	208	14.4	0.92–2.8	1.2–11	no	MGS	MGS	Memnonia	Lucus Planum	8.786°S 182.673°E	
2001-12-05	2000-09-13	447	37.3	2.7–8.0	29–260	no	MGS	MGS	Amazonis	Amazonis Planitia	0.933°N 191.746°E	
2002-10-08	2002-02-14	236	19.9	1.3–4.0	3.5–34	no	MGS	MGS	Lunae Palus	Tharsis Rise	4.962°N 277.789°E	
2003-04-15	1990-07-29	4643	15.3	0.99–3.0	1.5–14	no	MGS	Viking 1	Amazonis	Olympus Mons	22.814°N 219.910°E	
2003-05-07	2002-12-02	155	22.6	1.5–4.6	5.5–50	no	MGS	Odyssey	Arabia	Arabia Terra	20.427°N 3.295°E	
2003-07-17	2001-11-12	611	17.5	1.1–3.4	2.3–21	no	MGS	MGS	Phoenicis Lacus	Daedalia Planum	3.616°S 234.243°E	
2003-08-20	2001-07-11	770	25.2	1.7–5.1	8.0–72	no	Odyssey	MGS	Amazonis	Tharsis Rise	5.469°N 224.353°E	
2003-12-11	2002-08-06	491	24.5	1.7–5.0	7.3–65	no	MGS	MGS	Arabia	Arabia Terra	21.958°N 14.605°E	
2004-01-27	2003-11-19	69	12.0	0.75–2.3	0.67–6.0	no	Odyssey	Odyssey	Amazonis	Eumenides Dorsum	1.686°N 199.382°E	
2004-02-07	2003-09-12	147	16.8	1.1–3.3	2.1–18	no	Odyssey	MGS	Tharsis	Uranius Mons	27.055°N 268.332°E	
2004-04-22	2004-03-07	45	10.6	0.66–2.0	0.44–4.0	no	Odyssey	MGS	Amazonis	Tharsis Rise	5.353°N 223.324°E	
2004-05-15	2004-04-19	25	33.5	2.4–7.1	21–180	no	Odyssey	Odyssey	Amazonis	Tharsis Rise	2.479°N 224.105°E	
2004-06-25	2003-08-30	299	10.0	0.61–1.8	0.36–3.3	no	Odyssey	Odyssey	Memnonia	Eumenides Dorsum	0.755°S 200.066°E	
2005-01-06	2003-11-01	432	58.2	4.3–13	130–1200	no	Odyssey	Odyssey	Mare Acidalium	Arabia Terra	34.682°N 352.981°E	
2005-03-21	2002-04-20	1066	36.4	2.6–7.7	27–240	no	MGS	MGS	Lunae Palus	Lunae Planum	5.131°N 290.591°E	
2005-04-29	2004-05-01	362	10.7	0.66–2.0	0.46–4.1	no	MGS	MGS	Arabia	Arabia Terra	28.990°N 26.926°E	
2005-06-08	2005-04-06	62	53.9	4.0–12	100–900	no	MGS	MGS	Coprates	Tithoniae Fossae	2.355°S 278.259°E	
2005-06-13	2003-04-10	795	15.6	1.0–3.0	1.6–14	no	MGS	MGS	Syrtis Major	Terra Sabaea	23.087°N 52.879°E	
2005-06-22	2004-07-20	337	10.6	0.66–2.0	0.44–4.0	no	Odyssey	Odyssey	Tharsis	Tharsis Montes	3.397°N 253.910°E	
2005-09-07	2005-05-06	123	12.9	0.82–2.5	0.85–7.7	no	Express	Express	Lunae Palus	Lunae Planum	1.090°N 284.420°E	
2005-11-26	2004-12-01	359	16.7	1.1–3.3	2.0–18	no	Odyssey	MGS	Arabia	Arabia Terra	26.158°N 23.628°E	
2006-01-06	2005-06-10	210	18.6	1.2–3.7	2.9–26	no	MGS	Odyssey	Amazonis	Amazonis Planitia	13.851°N 206.582°E	
2006-01-12	2004-09-12	487	20.8	1.4–4.2	4.2–38	no	MGS	MGS	Tharsis	Tharsis Montes	10.375°N 250.216°E	
2006-01-31	2006-01-10	20	21.7	1.5–4.4	4.8–43	no	MGS	Odyssey	Syrtis Major	Terra Sabaea	25.601°N 52.147°E	
2006-02-07	2005-02-06	366	12.1	0.76–2.3	0.69–6.2	no	Odyssey	Odyssey	Amazonis	Marte Vallis	4.771°N 180.145°E	
2006-02-13	2005-12-25	50	10.6	0.66–2.0	0.44–4.0	no	MGS	Odyssey	Amazonis	Amazonis Planitia	19.774°N 207.425°E	
2006-02-14	2005-03-28	323	29.3	2.0–6.1	13–120	no	MGS	Odyssey	Phoenicis Lacus	Daedalia Planum	0.033°S 226.907°E	
2006-02-21	2006-02-08	12	15.4	0.99–3.0	1.5–14	no	Odyssey	Odyssey	Tharsis	Ceraunius Tholus	24.676°N 261.522°E	
2006-02-25	2006-01-10	45	11.0	0.68–2.0	0.50–4.5	no	Express	Express	Phoenicis Lacus	Noctis Labyrinthus	4.370°S 264.598°E	
2006-02-26	2005-02-21	370	16.9	1.1–3.3	2.1–19	no	MGS	Odyssey	Lunae Palus	Tharsis Rise	13.709°N 275.674°E	
2006-02-26	2005-09-04	174	17.7	1.2–3.5	2.4–22	no	MGS	Express	Arabia	Arabia Terra	28.455°N 25.196°E	
2006-02-26	2005-12-07	87	36.8	2.6–7.8	28–250	no	MGS	Odyssey	Tharsis	Tharsis Montes	6.989°N 247.914°E	
2006-07-10	2005-04-11	454	11.2	0.70–2.1	0.53–4.8	no	Express	Express	Phoenicis Lacus	Noctis Labyrinthus	4.545°S 256.914°E	
2006-07-13	2005-10-30	255	10.8	0.67–2.0	0.47–4.2	no	Express	Odyssey	Elysium	Phlegra Rise	29.497°N 155.825°E	
2007-03-27	2004-11-25	851	14.3	0.91–2.7	1.2–11	no	MRO	Odyssey	Lunae Palus	Labeatis Fossae	27.613°N 279.526°E	
2007-04-06	2006-01-12	449	13.0	0.82–2.5	0.87–7.9	no	MRO	Odyssey	Margaritifer Sinus	Aureum Chaos	6.057°S 334.342°E	
2007-04-14	2006-09-26	199	10.1	0.62–1.9	0.38–3.4	no	MRO	Odyssey	Phoenicis Lacus	Daedalia Planum	3.107°S 233.105°E	
2007-10-15	2007-05-30	137	10.3	0.64–1.9	0.40–3.6	no	MRO	MRO	Tharsis	Tharsis Montes	16.612°N 246.315°E	
2007-11-27	2006-07-28	487	22.0	1.5–4.4	5.1–45	maybe	MRO	Express	Cebrenia	Galaxias Colles	39.373°N 149.373°E	
2007-12-20	2007-07-02	171	16.0	1.0–3.1	1.7–16	no	MRO	MRO	Tharsis	Tharsis Tholus	14.524°N 268.850°E	
2008-05-01	2007-02-21	434	36.2	2.6–7.7	27–240	no	MRO	Odyssey	Memnonia	Mangala Valles	7.052°S 210.263°E	
2008-05-07	2007-01-07	486	10.3	0.64–1.9	0.40–3.6	no	MRO	Odyssey	Tharsis	Fortuna Fossae	2.386°N 266.725°E	
2008-05-09	2006-11-20	536	12.3	0.77–2.3	0.73–6.5	no	MRO	Odyssey	Phoenicis Lacus	Tharsis Montes	1.280°S 250.120°E	
2008-06-15	2006-11-14	578	15.0	0.96–2.9	1.4–13	no	MRO	Express	Ismenius Lacus	Arabia Terra	32.747°N 37.632°E	
2008-06-28	2006-07-01	728	12.0	0.75–2.3	0.67–6.0	yes	MRO	Odyssey	Diacria	Arcadia Planitia	46.179°N 188.495°E	
2008-06-29	2006-10-18	619	11.6	0.72–2.2	0.60–5.4	maybe	MRO	Odyssey	Diacria	Acheron Fossae	40.322°N 221.222°E	
2008-11-14	2008-07-22	114	17.5	1.1–3.4	2.3–21	no	Express	Odyssey	Tharsis	Tharsis Montes	5.455°N 262.318°E	
2008-12-14	2007-09-03	468	10.1	0.62–1.9	0.38–3.4	no	Odyssey	Express	Tharsis	Ulysses Fossae	14.253°N 237.962°E	
2009-01-02	2006-12-13	751	12.4	0.78–2.3	0.75–6.7	no	Odyssey	Express	Tharsis	Rhabon Valles	21.442°N 267.224°E	
2009-02-18	2008-01-16	399	11.1	0.69–2.1	0.52–4.6	no	MRO	MRO	Elysium	Marte Vallis	5.543°N 177.891°E	
2009-04-07	2007-11-24	499	10.3	0.64–1.9	0.40–3.6	no	MRO	Express	Phoenicis Lacus	Noctis Labyrinthus	6.325°S 254.717°E	
2009-05-03	2007-06-30	673	15.0	0.96–2.9	1.4–13	no	MRO	Express	Memnonia	Lucus Planum	5.813°S 190.371°E	
2009-05-10	2007-05-17	724	10.1	0.62–1.9	0.38–3.4	no	MRO	Odyssey	Phoenicis Lacus	Daedalia Planum	5.734°S 226.414°E	
2009-05-20	2008-03-25	421	36.0	2.6–7.7	26–240	no	MRO	MRO	Phoenicis Lacus	Pavonis Mons	0.630°S 248.913°E	
2009-05-22	2008-09-12	252	10.7	0.66–2.0	0.46–4.1	no	MRO	MRO	Tharsis	Gordii Fossae	14.760°N 230.115°E	
2009-06-01	2007-06-29	703	16.4	1.1–3.2	1.9–17	no	MRO	Express	Memnonia	Eumenides Dorsum	1.496°S 200.625°E	
2009-07-10	2007-12-08	580	21.9	1.5–4.4	5.0–45	no	MRO	Odyssey	Phoenicis Lacus	Noctis Labyrinthus	7.302°S 258.141°E	
2009-08-05	2007-05-02	825	10.8	0.67–2.0	0.47–4.2	no	MRO	Odyssey	Memnonia	Daedalia Planum	4.219°S 220.551°E	
2009-08-16	2007-12-24	601	23.3	1.6–4.7	6.1–55	no	MRO	Express	Syrtis Major	Arabia Terra	29.437°N 49.148°E	
2009-12-24	2009-01-09	349	10.1	0.62–1.9	0.38–3.4	no	MRO	Express	Tharsis	Tharsis Montes	13.243°N 260.953°E	
2009-12-28	2007-08-01	880	12.3	0.77–2.3	0.73–6.5	no	MRO	Express	Ismenius Lacus	Arabia Terra	32.294°N 28.959°E	
2010-01-18	2007-10-31	809	18.4	1.2–3.6	2.8–25	no	MRO	Express	Sinus Sabaeus	Terra Sabaea	1.326°S 30.799°E	
2010-01-21	2007-12-24	758	20.6	1.4–4.1	4.1–36	no	MRO	Express	Phoenicis Lacus	Noctis Fossae	3.792°S 264.801°E	
2010-01-24	2009-06-25	227	33.8	2.4–7.1	21–190	yes	MRO	Odyssey	Cebrenia	Phlegra Montes	44.222°N 164.201°E	
2010-03-25	2009-03-25	364	20.0	1.3–4.0	3.7–33	yes	MRO	Odyssey	Ismenius Lacus	Vastitas Borealis	63.919°N 44.878°E	
2010-08-20	2010-05-31	80	17.4	1.1–3.4	2.3–21	no	MRO	MRO	Cebrenia	Utopia Planitia	41.017°N 126.301°E	
2010-09-18	2007-07-02	1173	16.2	1.1–3.2	1.8–16	no	MRO	Odyssey	Phoenicis Lacus	Daedalia Planum	8.650°S 225.048°E	
2010-10-08	2008-08-30	768	17.8	1.2–3.5	2.5–22	no	Odyssey	Express	Lunae Palus	Echus Palus	13.365°N 283.771°E	
2010-10-23	2009-08-17	431	16.1	1.0–3.1	1.8–16	no	Odyssey	MRO	Tharsis	Tharsis Rise	22.774°N 247.591°E	
2010-11-23	2010-03-10	258	17.6	1.2–3.5	2.4–22	no	Odyssey	MRO	Diacria	Acheron Fossae	35.869°N 230.873°E	
2012-02-03	2011-12-04	61	16.1	1.0–3.1	1.8–16	no	MRO	MRO	Aeolis	Avernus Cavi	4.526°S 172.452°E	
2012-02-18	2010-06-24	604	16.7	1.1–3.3	2.0–18	no	MRO	MRO	Memnonia	Daedalia Planum	1.751°S 221.294°E	
2012-03-11	2010-04-02	708	21.2	1.4–4.2	4.5–40	no	MRO	Odyssey	Tharsis	Tharsis Rise	15.942°N 248.613°E	
2012-03-26	2011-12-26	91	24.2	1.6–4.9	6.9–62	no	MRO	MRO	Mare Tyrrhenum	Terra Cimmeria	14.433°S 132.700°E	
2012-03-28	2012-03-27	0	48.7	3.6–11	71–640	no	MRO	MRO	Amazonis	Amazonis Planitia	3.350°N 219.404°E	
2012-05-09	2010-03-07	793	19.6	1.3–3.9	3.4–31	no	MRO	Express	Arabia	Terra Sabaea	2.037°N 44.546°E	
2012-05-16	2011-06-20	331	22.8	1.5–4.6	5.7–51	no	MRO	MRO	Syrtis Major	Terra Sabaea	3.680°N 53.428°E	
2012-07-05	2010-08-29	675	16.1	1.0–3.1	1.8–16	yes	MRO	MRO	Diacria	Erebus Montes	39.109°N 190.253°E	
2012-07-12	2010-05-12	792	15.3	0.99–3.0	1.5–14	no	MRO	MRO	Arabia	Arabia Terra	28.603°N 36.855°E	
2012-10-25	2010-08-26	791	18.1	1.2–3.6	2.6–24	no	MRO	MRO	Syrtis Major	Syrtis Major Planum	5.998°N 68.969°E	
2013-02-11	2010-07-30	927	30.2	2.1–6.3	15–130	no	MRO	Odyssey	Thaumasia	Solis Planum	31.391°S 287.907°E	
2013-06-08	2012-09-22	259	16.3	1.1–3.2	1.9–17	no	MRO	MRO	Iapygia	Terra Sabaea	6.924°S 66.947°E	
2013-06-21	2010-05-29	1118	24.0	1.6–4.9	6.7–61	no	MRO	MRO	Mare Tyrrhenum	Terra Cimmeria	5.367°S 132.138°E	314 kilometers (195 mi) from Curiosity rover (not yet landed?)
2013-09-28	2010-12-12	1021	18.0	1.2–3.5	2.6–23	no	?	?	Elysium	Elysium Fossae	19.511°N 147.353°E	
2014-02-06	2013-01-29	372	15.1	0.97–2.9	1.4–13	no	MRO	MRO	Arcadia	Tempe Fossae	34.192°N 280.261°E	
2014-02-19	2010-12-20	1157	24.0	1.6–4.9	6.7–61	no	MRO	Odyssey	Arabia	Terra Sabaea	14.850°N 43.893°E	
2014-03-14	2011-03-17	1093	16.0	1.0–3.1	1.7–16	no	MRO	MRO	Diacria	Amazonis Planitia	32.291°N 212.948°E	
2014-03-15	2011-02-15	1124	16.7	1.1–3.3	2.0–18	no	MRO	Express	Arabia	Arabia Terra	29.204°N 22.177°E	
2014-03-26	2012-02-16	768	15.7	1.0–3.0	1.6–15	no	MRO	Odyssey	Phoenicis Lacus	Daedalia Planum	13.417°S 225.900°E	
2014-05-07	2011-03-20	1144	27.5	1.9–5.6	10–91	no	MRO	Express	Amenthes	Isidis Planitia	14.710°N 99.806°E	
2014-05-23	2009-11-30	1635	15.3	0.99–3.0	1.5–14	no	MRO	Odyssey	Lunae Palus	Sacra Dorsa	8.201°N 290.434°E	
2014-07-01	2011-04-04	1184	21.0	1.4–4.2	4.3–39	no	MRO	Express	Tharsis	Tharsis Rise	6.254°N 264.444°E	
2014-11-30	2013-05-13	565	15.8	1.0–3.1	1.7–15	no	MRO	Odyssey	Tharsis	Tharsis Rise	8.635°N 239.427°E	
2015-01-18	2011-06-06	1321	19.9	1.3–4.0	3.5–34	no	MRO	MRO	Arabia	Arabia Terra	27.657°N 11.597°E	
2015-09-09	2013-08-02	768	21.8	1.5–4.4	4.9–44	no	MRO	MRO	Tharsis	Tharsis Rise	13.122°N 244.189°E	
2016-02-06	2011-08-01	1649	15.5	1.0–3.0	1.6–14	no	MRO	MRO	Amazonis	Amazonis Planitia	24.949°N 193.127°E	
2016-04-15	2012-07-02	1383	16.3	1.1–3.2	1.9–17	no	MRO	MRO	Elysium	Elysium Planitia	25.290°N 155.523°E	
2016-05-28	2015-12-29	151	27.9	1.9–5.8	11–100	no	MRO	MRO	Tharsis	Sulci Gordii	16.659°N 233.284°E	
2016-05-30	2013-08-07	1027	48.0	3.5–11	68–610	yes	MRO	MRO	Ismenius Lacus	Terra Sabaea	41.464°N 48.765°E	
2016-06-02	2012-05-03	1491	16.0	1.0–3.1	1.7–16	yes	MRO	MRO	Ismenius Lacus	Ismeniae Fossae	41.913°N 36.426°E	
2016-07-22	2012-04-09	1564	18.2	1.2–3.6	2.7–24	no	MRO	Express	Amenthes	Nepenthes Planum	11.973°N 126.289°E	
2016-09-10	2014-07-12	790	17.2	1.1–3.4	2.2–20	no	MRO	MRO	Memnonia	Terra Sirenum	15.632°S 181.071°E	321 kilometers (199 mi) from Spirit rover (defunct).
2016-10-10	2012-07-15	1547	36.6	2.6–7.8	28–250	no	MRO	Odyssey	Amazonis	Amazonis Planitia	11.042°N 193.009°E	
2016-11-19	2013-08-19	1187	15.6	1.0–3.0	1.6–14	no	MRO	Odyssey	Elysium	Elysium Planitia	11.311°N 138.279°E	425 kilometres (264 mi) from InSight (not yet landed).
2016-12-02	2012-12-27	1436	29.6	2.1–6.2	14–120	no	MRO	MRO	Elysium	Marte Vallis	7.807°N 176.451°E	
2017-05-29	2013-09-08	1358	32.5	2.3–6.8	19–170	no	MRO	MRO	Tharsis	Tharsis Rise	9.261°N 241.894°E	
2017-10-01	2014-01-25	1345	19.5	1.3–3.9	3.4–30	no	MRO	MRO	Tharsis	Olympus Mons	14.699°N 227.369°E	
2017-11-12	2015-12-02	710	15.7	1.0–3.0	1.6–15	no	MRO	MRO	Syrtis Major	Terra Sabaea	13.309°N 54.461°E	
2018-01-11	2015-02-05	1070	17.5	1.1–3.4	2.3–21	no	MRO	Odyssey	Ismenius Lacus	Terra Sabaea	35.591°N 42.506°E	
2018-03-19	2013-01-08	1895	19.1	1.3–3.8	3.2–28	no	MRO	MRO	Memnonia	Daedalia Planum	10.122°S 220.782°E	
2018-04-29	2014-03-02	1519	23.3	1.6–4.7	6.1–55	no	MRO	MRO	Syrtis Major	Isidis Planitia	21.594°N 88.255°E	
2018-05-06	2013-05-28	1803	23.7	1.6–4.8	6.5–58	no	MRO	MRO	Tharsis	Ulysses Fossae	6.209°N 235.245°E	
2018-05-11	2012-10-02	2047	15.6	1.0–3.0	1.6–14	no	MRO	MRO	Sinus Sabaeus	Schiaparelli Crater	2.867°S 16.199°E	
2018-08-28	2016-10-24	672	15.6	1.0–3.0	1.6–14	no	MRO	MRO	Tharsis	Biblis Tholus	1.863°N 236.017°E	
2018-09-14	2018-08-17	27	15.3	0.99–3.0	1.5–14	no	MRO	MRO	Mare Australe	Promethei Planum	81.491°S 41.349°E	
2018-11-25	2013-08-22	1920	34.3	2.4–7.3	22–200	no	MRO	MRO	Arabia	Terra Sabaea	14.385°N 24.622°E	
2018-11-26	2016-08-14	833	52.9	3.9–12	94–850	no	MRO	MRO	Noachis	Noachis Terra	34.649°S 35.967°E	
2018-12-03	2014-04-03	1704	15.5	1.0–3.0	1.6–14	no	MRO	MRO	Tharsis	Tharsis Rise	1.910°N 264.158°E	
2019-02-04	2017-11-29	432	17.3	1.1–3.4	2.2–20	no	MRO	MRO	Coprates	Sinai Planum	16.419°S 274.739°E	
2019-06-02	2018-04-18	409	17.6	1.2–3.5	2.4–22	no	MRO	MRO	Phoenicis Lacus	Noctis Labyrinthus	7.379°S 258.229°E	
2020-01-06	2019-10-15	83	20.8	1.4–4.2	4.2–38	no	MRO	MRO	Margaritifer Sinus	Iazu Crater	2.718°S 354.863°E	26 kilometers (16 mi) from Opportunity rover (defunct). 74 kilometers (46 mi) from Schiaparelli EDM (crashed).
2020-03-05	2019-05-25	285	22.5	1.5–4.5	5.3–48	no	?	?	Elysium	Tartarus Colles	21.478°N 173.27°E	
2020-05-27	2020-05-27	0	11.9	0.75–2.2	0.65–5.9	maybe	?	?	Elysium	Elysium Planitia	9.382°N 135.377°E	Detected by InSight as a magnitude 2.3 marsquake
2020-06-28	2019-08-03	330	51.6	3.8–11	87–780	no	MRO	MRO	Mare Australe	Planum Australe	82.030°S 175.703°E	337 kilometers (209 mi) from Mars Polar Lander (crashed).
2020-08-01	2017-09-15	1051	54.2	4.0–12	100–920	no	MRO	Express	Amazonis	Amazonis Planitia	23.583°N 206.871°E	
2021-02-18	2021-02-18	0	3.9	0.22–0.65	0.016–0.14	no	?	?	Amenthes	Elysium Planitia	4.606°N 134.087°E	Detected by InSight as a magnitude 1.4 marsquake
2021-02-19	2021-02-19	0	21.5	1.4–4.3	4.7–42	no	?	?	Elysium	Cerberus Fossae	9.475°N 163.027°E	Detected by InSight as a magnitude 2.8 marsquake
2021-08-31	2021-08-31	0	7.2	0.43–1.3	0.12–1.1	no	?	?	Elysium	Elysium Planitia	0.397°N 135.688°E	Detected by InSight as a magnitude 1.6 marsquake
2021-09-05	2021-09-05	0	6.1	0.35–1.0	0.070–0.60	no	MRO	?	Elysium	Elysium Planitia	3.974°N 136.963°E	Detected by InSight as a magnitude 1.2 marsquake
2021-09-18	2021-09-18	0	130	11–32	1900–17000	no	MRO	MRO	Arcadia	Tempe Fossae	34.80°N 280.12°E	Detected by InSight
2021-12-24	2021-12-24	0	150	12–37	3100–27000	yes	MRO	MRO	Amazonis	Amazonis Planitia	35.088°N 189.823°E	Detected by InSight as a magnitude 4 marsquake

== See also ==
- Impact event
- Impact events on Jupiter
- Marsquake
