= Acheron Fossae =

Fossae on Mars

- View to Acheron Fossae
- Coordinates: 37.67°N 135.87°W

Acheron Fossae is a trough in the Diacria quadrangle of Mars. Its location is centered at 37.67° north latitude and 135.87° west longitude. It is 718 km long and is named after a classical albedo feature at 35°N, 140°W . The trough has seen intensive tectonic activity in the past. Despite its crescent shape similar to the nearby aureole surrounding Olympus Mons, it is unrelated to them and predates the aureole which are Amazonian in age while Acheron is Hesperian in age.

The term "fossae" is used to indicate large troughs when using geographical terminology related to Mars. Troughs, sometimes also called grabens, form when the crust is stretched until it breaks, which forms two breaks with a middle section moving down, leaving steep cliffs along the sides. Sometimes, a line of pits form as materials collapse into a void that forms from the stretching.

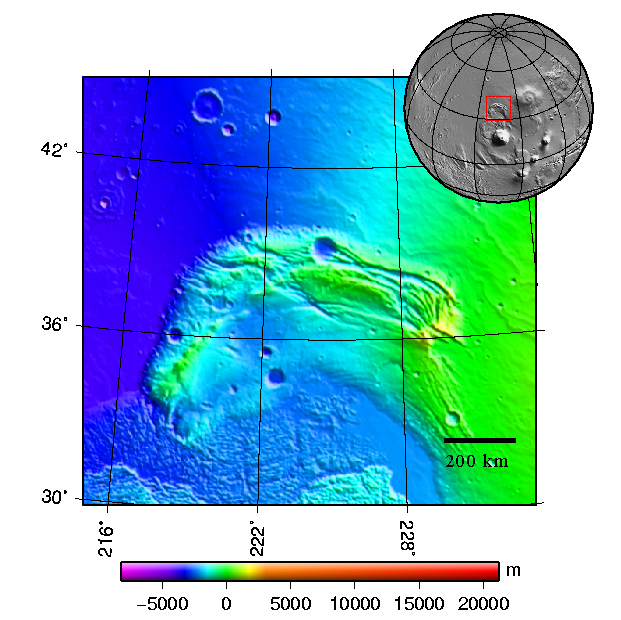
Topography map of Acheron Fossae

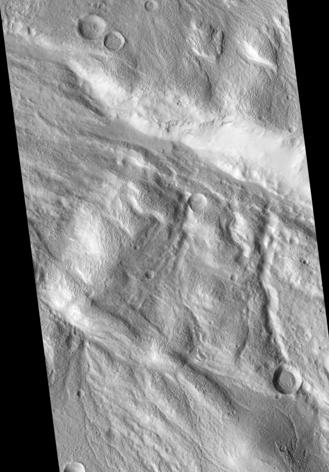
Acheron Fossae Dissected Crater, as seen by HiRISE. Part of eroded floor is shown in image.

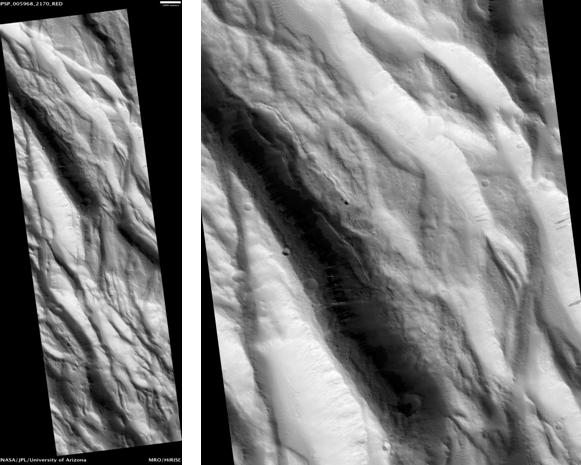
Acheron Fossae, as seen by HiRISE. Scale bar is 1000 meters long. Click on image to see dark slope streaks.

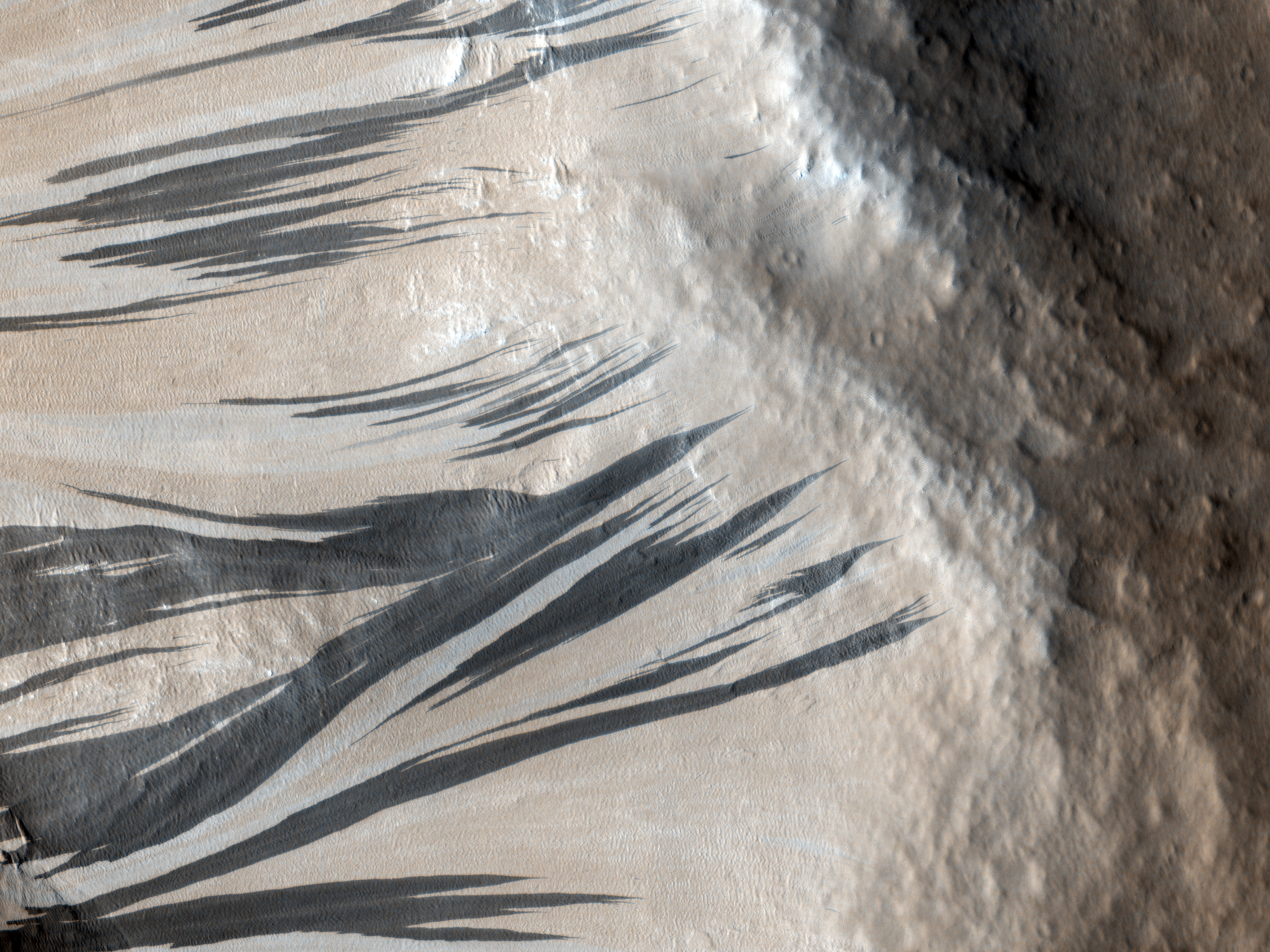
One theory is dark sand flowed down the slopes of Acheron Fossae. However, they lighten in color over time.

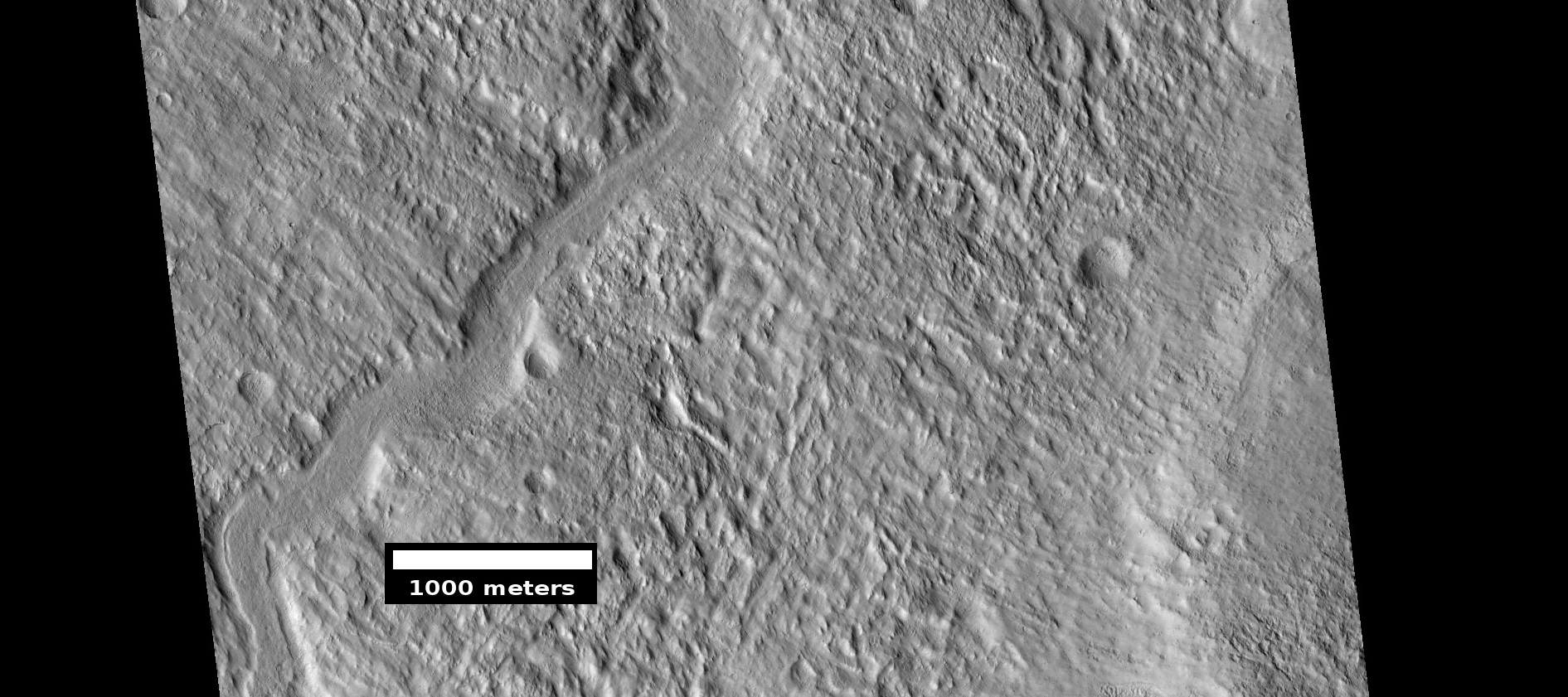
Channel in Acheron Fossae, as seen by HiRISE under HiWish program

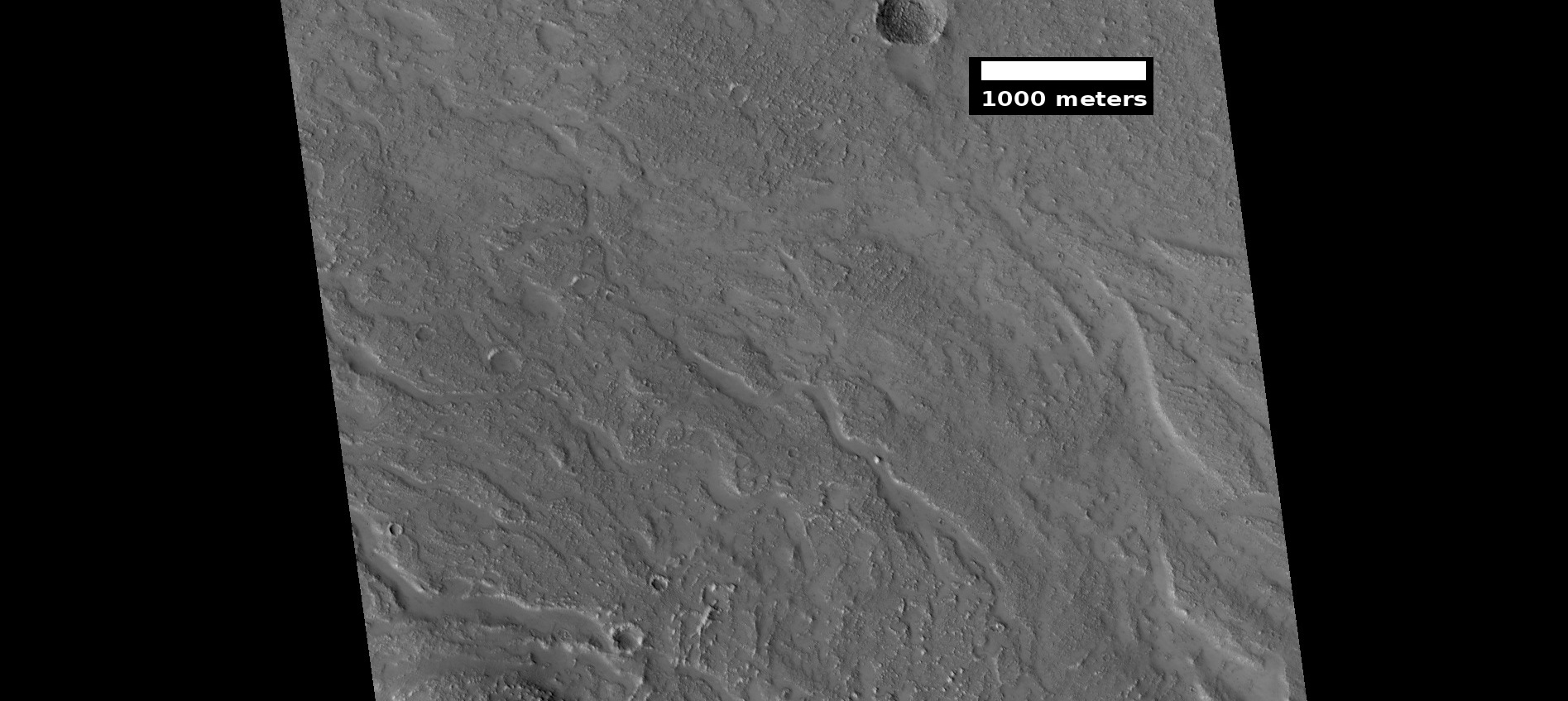
Channels, as seen by HiRISE under HiWish program

== See also ==
- Fossa (geology)
- Geology of Mars
- HiRISE
- HiWish
- Acheron
