= Claritas Fossae =

Canyon on Mars

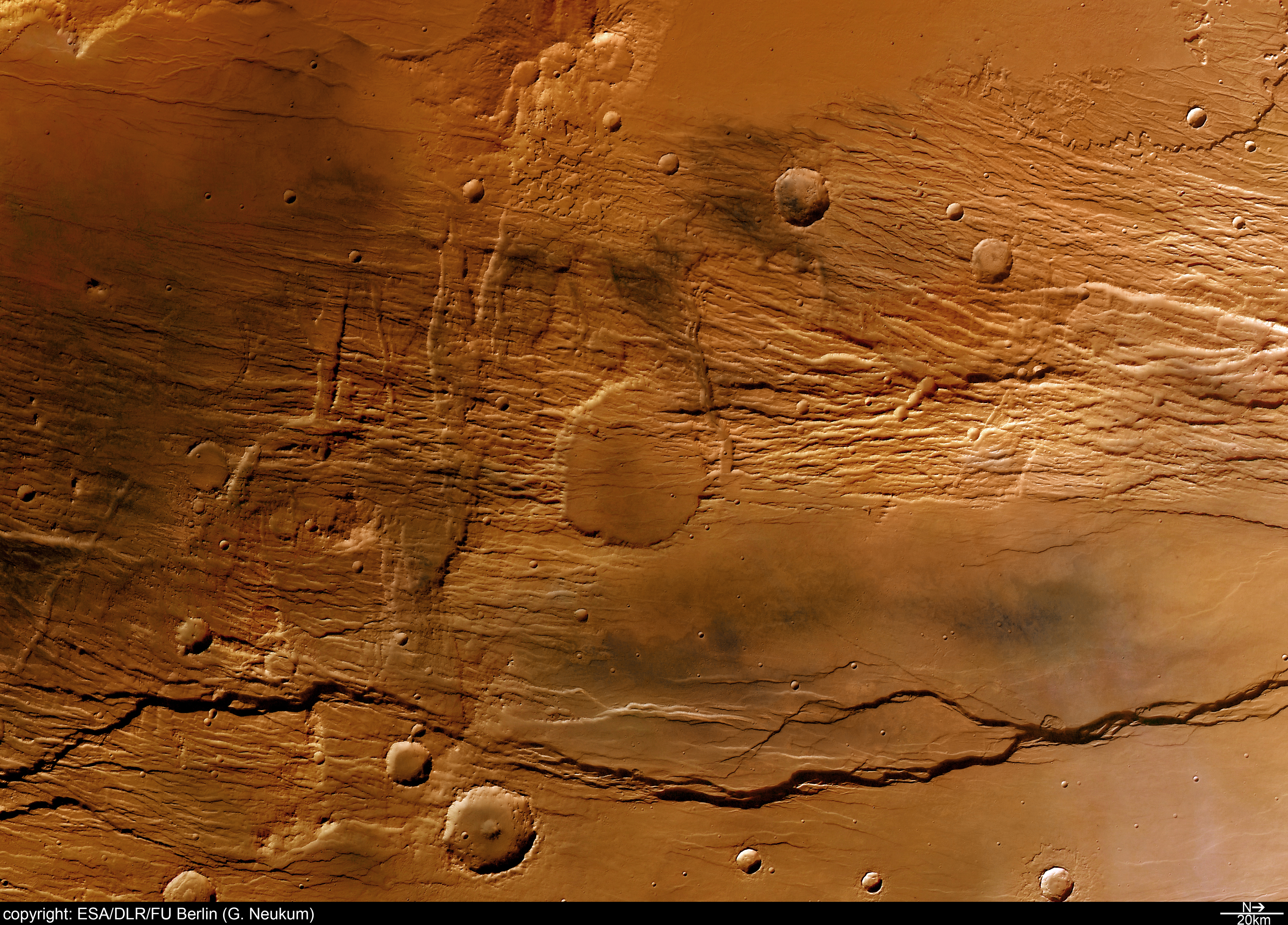
- Claritas Fossae as seen by Mars Express.
- Feature type: Fault system
- Coordinates: 31.5°S 104.1°W
- Length: ~2 030 km

Claritas Fossae is a densely-dissected highland terrain on the Tharsis Rise of Mars, located immediately south of the Tharsis Montes. The fossae of the Claritas Fossae region are many superposed swarms of graben.

== Context ==
Claritas Fossae is a group of troughs in the Phoenicis Lacus and Thaumasia quadrangles of Mars, located at 31.5 S and 104.1 W. The structure is 2,050.0 km long and was named after a classical albedo feature name. It was proposed that this area might be still tectonically active in relatively recent times.

== Geology ==
Long narrow depressions on Mars are called fossae. This term is derived from Latin; therefore fossa is singular and fossae is plural. Troughs form when the crust is stretched until it breaks. The stretching can be due to the large weight of a nearby volcano. Fossae/pit craters are common near volcanoes in the Tharsis and Elysium regions. A trough often has two breaks with a middle section moving down, leaving steep cliffs along the sides; such a trough is called a graben.

== Gallery ==
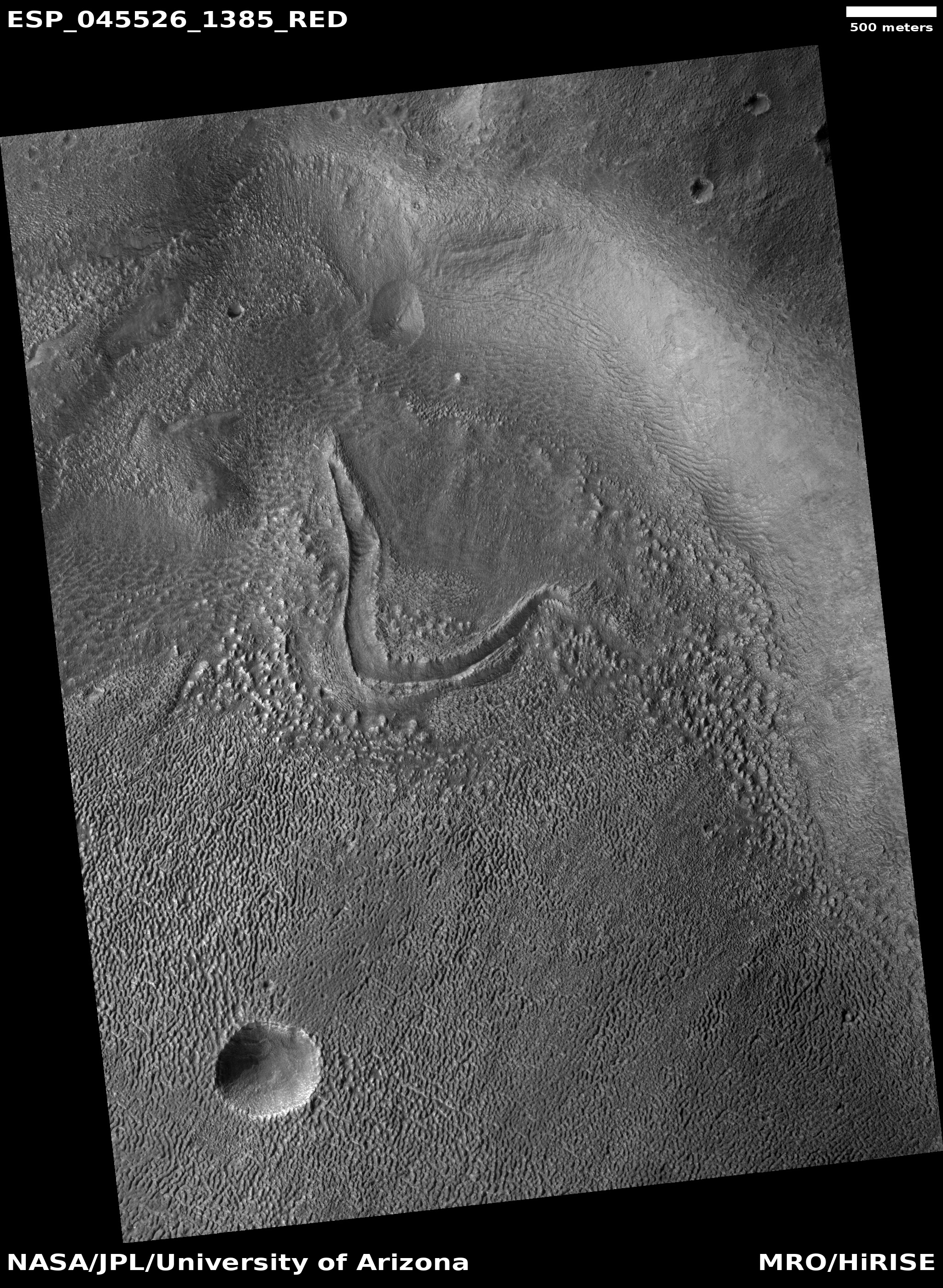
Curved ridge that probably was formed by glacier, as seen by HiRISE under HiWish program

== In culture ==
Claritas Fossae is the setting of the short story Loyal Soldier, part of the Mars Mars 2194 by Canadian author Jack Stornoway.

== See also ==
- Fossa (geology)
- Geology of Mars
- HiRISE
- HiWish program
