= Phoenicis Lacus quadrangle =

Map of Mars

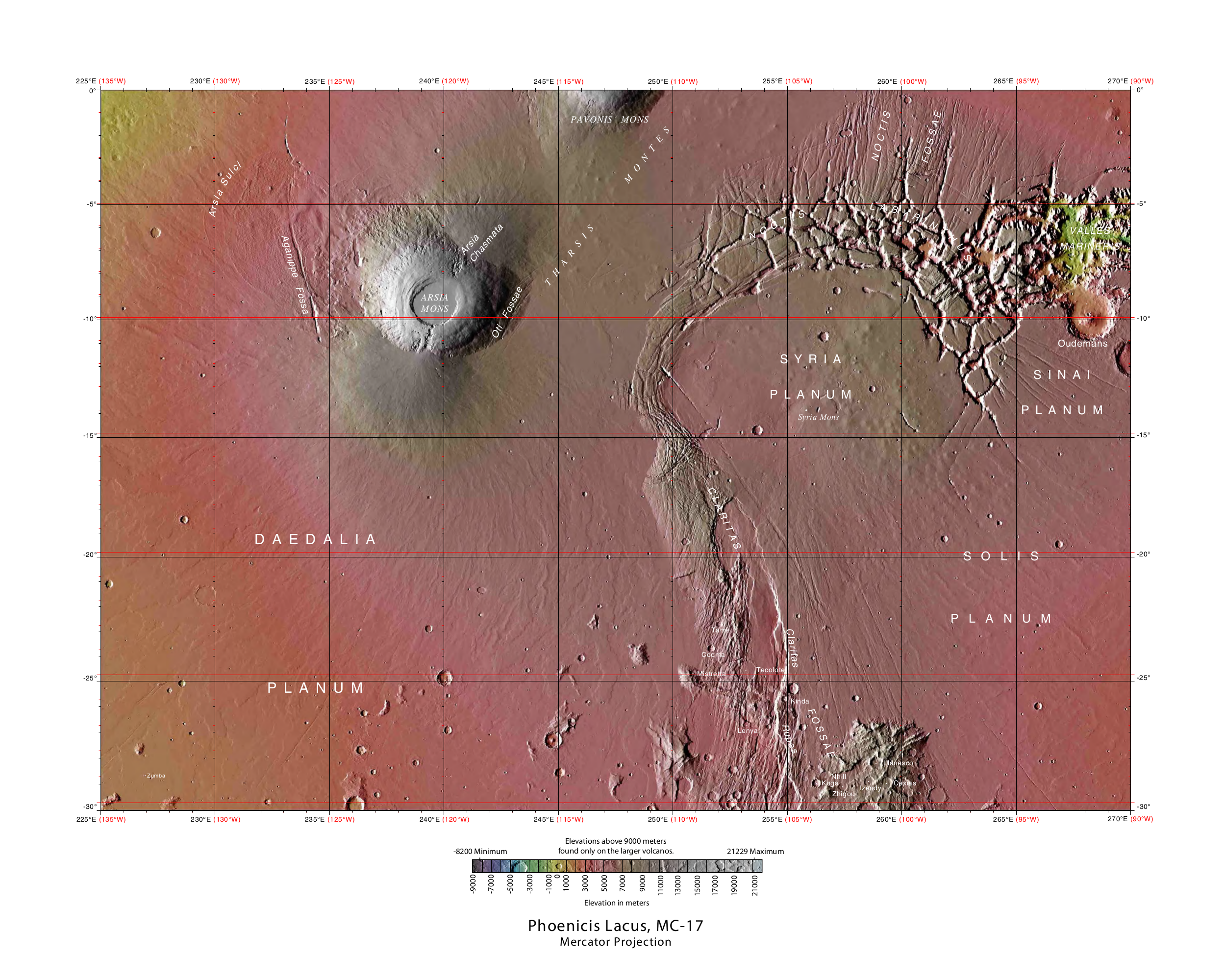
- Elevation map of Phoenicis Lacus quadrangle from Mars Orbiter Laser Altimeter (MOLA) data. .
- Coordinates: 15°S 112.5°W

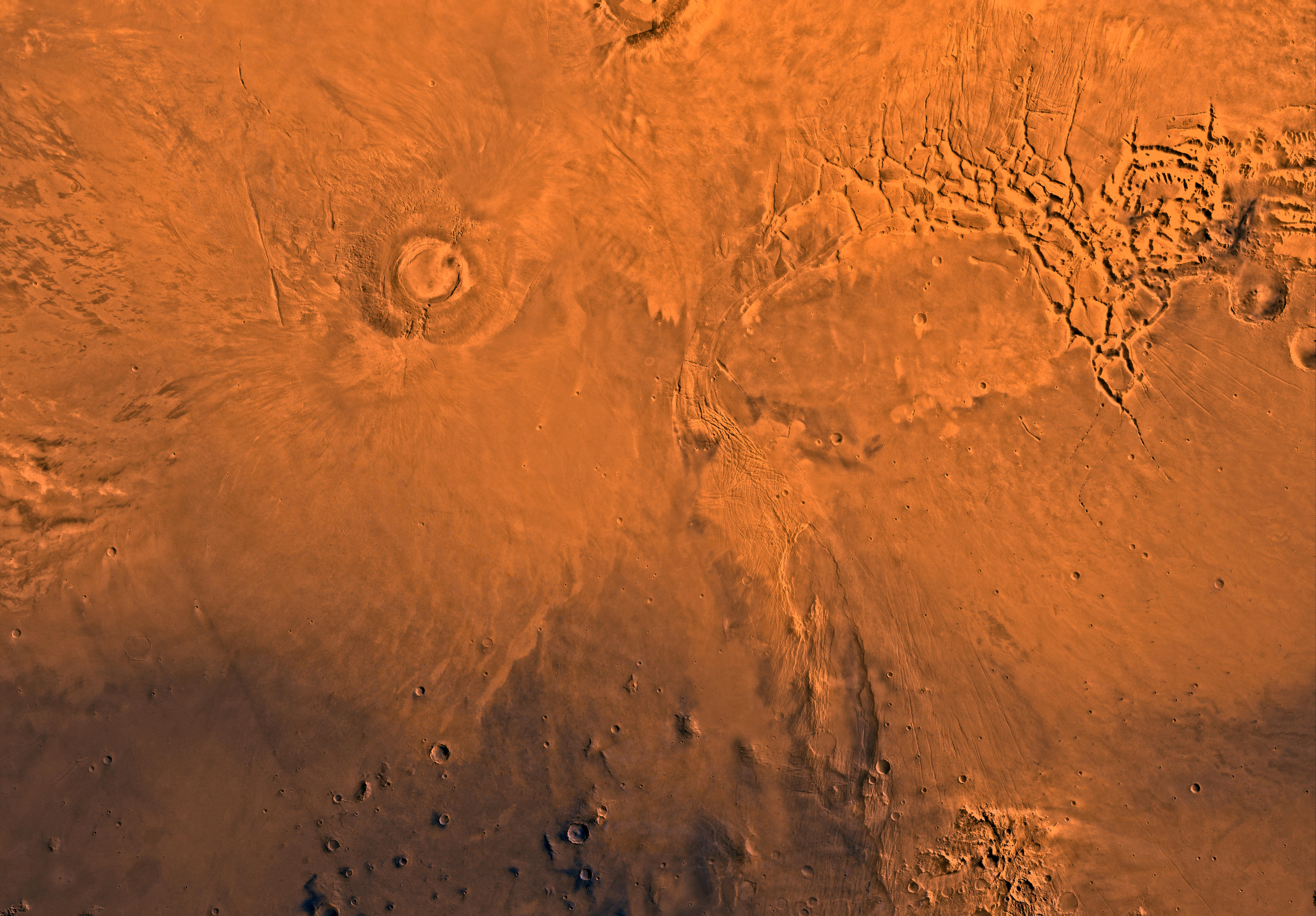
Image of the Phoenicis Lacus Quadrangle (MC-17). Most of the region includes the Tharsis plateau. The northwest contains Pavonis Mons and Arsia Mons, the east contains Syria Planum, the northeast includes Noctis Labyrinthus and the south-central part includes Claritas Fossae.

The Phoenicis Lacus quadrangle is one of a series of 30 quadrangle maps of Mars used by the United States Geological Survey (USGS) Astrogeology Research Program. The Phoenicis Lacus quadrangle is also referred to as MC-17 (Mars Chart-17). Parts of Daedalia Planum, Sinai Planum, and Solis Planum are found in this quadrangle. Phoenicis Lacus is named after the mythological phoenix.

The Phoenicis Lacus quadrangle covers the area from 90° to 135° west longitude and 0° to 30° south latitude on Mars. The Tharsus rise, which was formed from lava flows, occupies part of area. The volcanoes Pavonis Mons and Arsia Mons are believed to have once had glaciers on them. Glaciers may still exist under a thin layer of rocks. The ice can be a source of water for the possible future colonization of the planet. One of the most prominent features of this quadrangle is a large intersecting set of canyons called Noctis Labyrinthus. Other interesting features are lava channels, Dark slope streaks, pit crater chains, and large troughs (called fossae). Research published in the journal Icarus has found pits in Zumba Crater are caused by hot ejecta falling on ground containing ice. The pits are formed by heat forming steam that rushes out from groups of pits simultaneously, thereby blowing away from the pit ejecta.

== Noctis Labyrinthus ==
Noctis Labyrinthus is a large canyon system found in the Phoenicis Lacus quadrangle. Its walls contain many layers of rocks. Research, described in December 2009, found a variety of minerals—including clays, sulfates, and hydrated silicas in some of the layers.

== See also ==
- Climate of Mars
- Fossa (geology)
- Dark slope streak
- Geology of Mars
- Glaciers on Mars
- Groundwater on Mars
- HiRISE
- HiWish program
- List of quadrangles on Mars
- MOC Public Targeting Program
- Volcanism on Mars
- Water on Mars

MC-01 Mare Boreum (features)
MC-02 Diacria (features)		MC-03 Arcadia (features)	MC-04 Acidalium (features)	MC-05 Ismenius Lacus (features)		MC-06 Casius (features)	MC-07 Cebrenia (features)
MC-08 Amazonis (features)	MC-09 Tharsis (features)	MC-10 Lunae Palus (features)	MC-11 Oxia Palus (features)	MC-12 Arabia (features)	MC-13 Syrtis Major (features)	MC-14 Amenthes (features)	MC-15 Elysium (features)
MC-16 Memnonia (features)	MC-17 Phoenicis Lacus (features)	MC-18 Coprates (features)	MC-19 Margaritifer Sinus (features)	MC-20 Sinus Sabaeus (features)	MC-21 Iapygia (features)	MC-22 Mare Tyrrhenum (features)	MC-23 Aeolis (features)
MC-24 Phaethontis (features)		MC-25 Thaumasia (features)	MC-26 Argyre (features)	MC-27 Noachis (features)		MC-28 Hellas (features)	MC-29 Eridania (features)
MC-30 Mare Australe (features)
