= Noctis Labyrinthus =

Labyrinthus on Mars

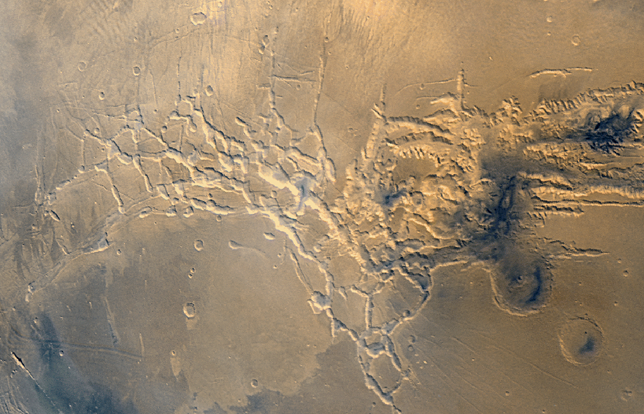
- Noctis Labyrinthus, as seen by Viking 1. North is up. The western initiation of the Valles Marineris is visible at the right. The Tharsis Montes are just beyond the horizon.
- Feature type: Canyon system
- Coordinates: 7.0°S 102.2°W
- Length: 1,263.0 km
- Eponym: Latin – Labyrinth of Night

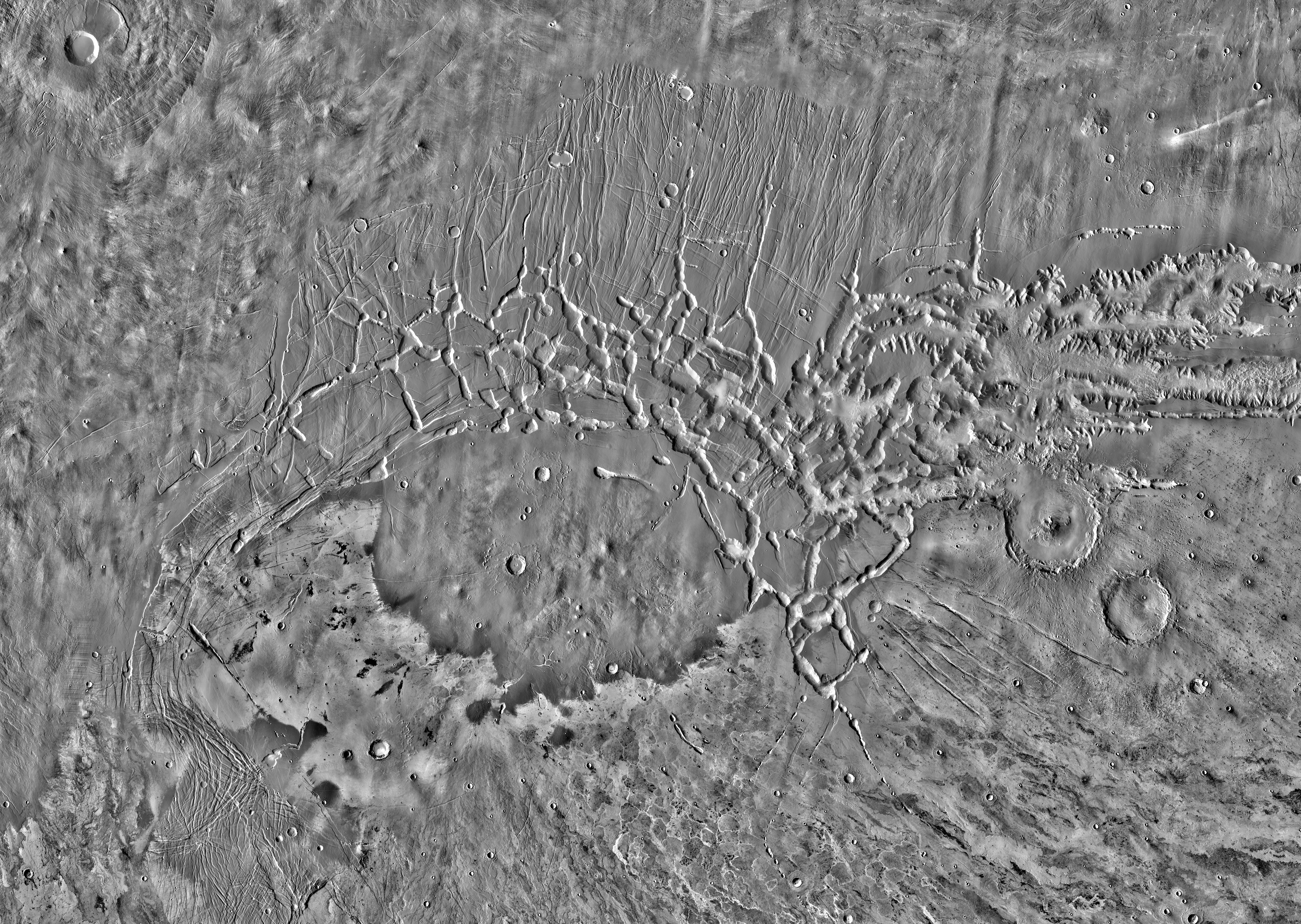
High resolution THEMIS daytime infrared image mosaic of Noctis Labyrinthus and its surroundings. The area is crisscrossed by multiple sets of graben running in different directions. The shield volcano Pavonis Mons is at upper left.

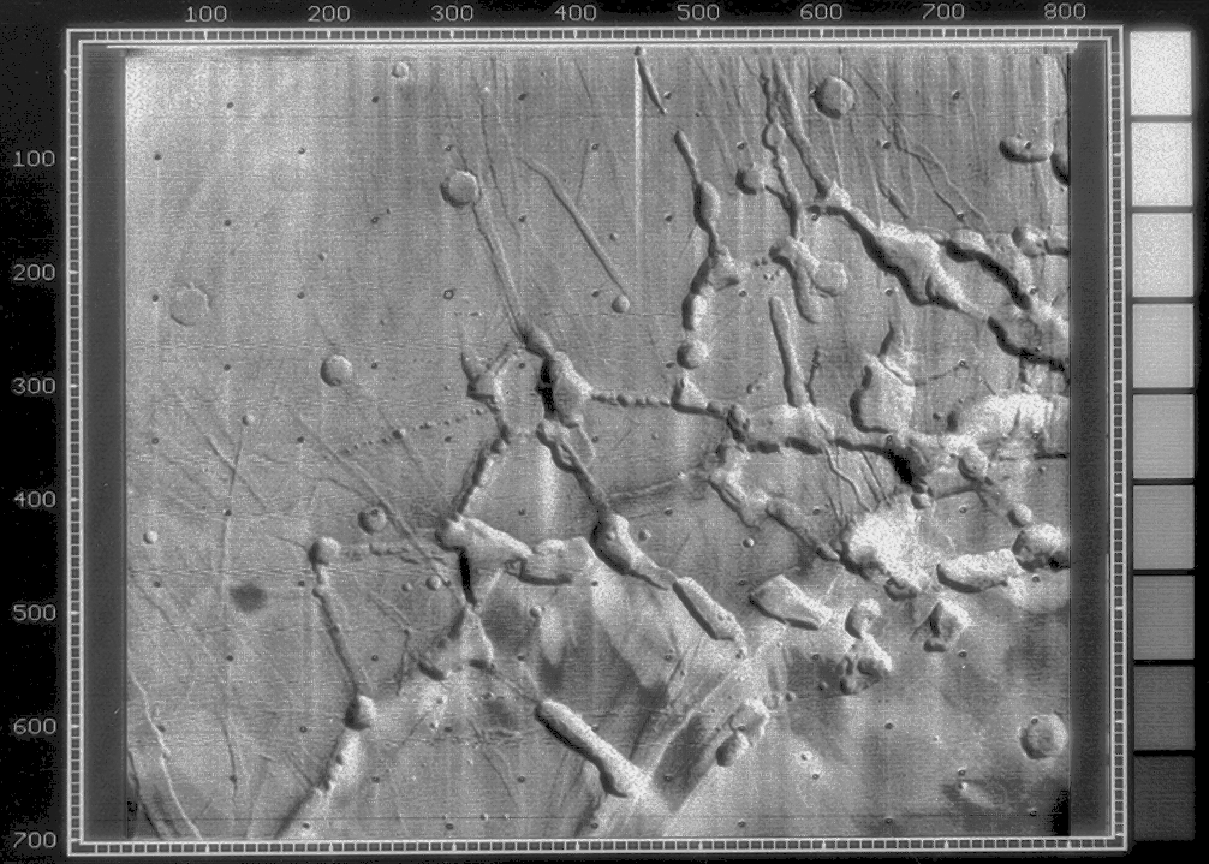
Mariner 9 view of the Noctis Labyrinthus "labyrinth" at the western end of Valles Marineris on Mars. Linear graben, grooves, and crater chains dominate this region, along with a number of flat-topped mesas. The image is roughly 400 km across, centered at 6 S, 105 W, at the edge of the Tharsis bulge. North is up. Image located in Phoenicis Lacus quadrangle

Noctis Labyrinthus (Latin for 'Labyrinth of the Night') is a region of Mars located in the Phoenicis Lacus quadrangle, between Valles Marineris and the Tharsis upland. The region is notable for its maze-like system of deep, steep-walled valleys. The valleys and canyons of this region formed by faulting and many show classic features of grabens, with the upland plain surface preserved on the valley floor. In some places the valley floors are rougher, disturbed by landslides, and there are places where the land appears to have sunk down into pit-like formations. It is thought that this faulting was triggered by volcanic activity in the Tharsis region. Research described in December 2009 found a variety of minerals, including clays, sulfates, and hydrated silicas, in some of the layers.

== Context ==
Noctis Labyrinthus is located in the heart of Tharsis at the western end of the Valles Marineris, manifesting as a network of graben that extends in a spider-like network before coalescing into a coherent, relatively shallow graben swarm that curves in a semicircular fashion towards the south into the Claritas Rise. The graben are known as the Claritas Fossae beyond this point.

== Geology ==
The Noctis Labyrinthus fracture zone is centered at the heart of the Tharsis Rise, dividing a plateau of Hesperian-Noachian age that is understood to be of a basaltic composition. The valleys of Noctis Labyrinthus fractured into three distinct trends (NNE/SSW, ENE/WSW, WNW/ESE) in an interlinked pattern that has been compared to the terrestrial fault systems that have formed over terrestrial domes. The formation of the fracture zone have been dated to the Late Hesperian based on crater counting age dates, concurrent with the formation of the lava plains of the adjacent Syria Planum province. Some researchers have modeled the formation of such chasmata on Mars on the propagation of simple graben underlain with dikes. As the underlying magma body drains, the chamber's pressure decreases and it begins to deflate. A chain of crater-like depressions forms, where the extent of the collapse dictated by how deeply the magma body is located. Noctis Labyrinthus is estimated to have experienced collapses from the drainage of magma chambers up to 5 km below the chasmata floors. In Noctis Labyrinthus in particular, some researchers have speculated that the fracture zone's corridors may connect deeper intrusive structures, forming a plumbing network more akin to the terrestrial Thulean mantle plume, which was responsible for the formation of the North Atlantic Igneous Province. In the chasmata of Noctis Labyrinthus, these pit crater chain collapse zones propagate directionally with a V-shaped tip, and can be used as an indicator of the direction into which magma withdraws from its underlying chamber. These V-tipped morphologies are generally found to propagate away from the center of the Tharsis Rise.

Other authors have proposed an alternate origin for Noctis Labyrinthus, linking its formation to the Valles Marineris and likening its initial formation to the expansion and collapse of a dense lava tube network. Supporters of the lava tube hypothesis note that no evidence of lateral lava flows from the chasmata have been observed, suggesting against the notion that dikes must be required to underlie the surface of the modern-day collapse features as there is no evidence that such a near-surface intrusion has breached the surface in the Noctis Labyrinthus region. Critics of a purely tectonic hypothesis have also noted that although pit crater chains (central to the diking hypothesis) are generally aligned and coincident with graben, they are occasionally found to bifurcate and to cross coeval graben in a perpendicular direction in the vicinity of Noctis Labyrinthus. Some authors have also proposed that Noctis Labyrinthus's chasmata may have formed due to extensional faulting in weakened rocks composed of interlayered tuff and lava flows, known to produce pit crater chains parallel to graben.

Other authors have suggested that phreatomagmatic processes were associated with the formation of the Noctis Labyrinthus chasmata. This hypothesis is not widely favored because chaos terrain morphology, proposed to form from this mechanism, is not found in the Noctis Labyrinthus fracture network. Chasmata and pit crater chains like those of Noctis Labyrinthus are likewise also not observed near areas where phreatomagmatic activity is strongly believed to have occurred, such as the Sisyphi Montes. Others have proposed that the chasmata of Noctis Labyrinthus are collapse features of a karstic nature, in which constituent carbonate rock is dissolved by meteoric water that has been acidified by acids originating in volcanic gases. This hypothesis has been challenged because carbonate spectral signatures have not been detected in the Noctis Labyrinthus network.

The walls of the valleys of Noctis Labyrinthus have been widened significantly by slumps that have canvassed the valley floors with debris taking the form of mudflows and boulders. Some authors have attributed the steady collapse of the valley walls to creep tied to thermal cycling, which could cause the repeated freezing and thawing of ground ice. Because of its location at the center of the Tharsis uplift, the melting associated with this creep could have been facilitated by increased heat flow to this area during periods of increased magmatic activity. No evidence of fluvial or aeolian erosion is observed in this region.

=== Mineralogical diversity ===
An unnamed depression near the southernmost extent of the Noctis Labyrinthus system, near the divide of Syria Planum and Sinai Planum and at the western end of the Valles Marineris, was found to be one of the most mineralogically diverse sites yet observed on the planet. These deposits, dated to the late Hesperian, post-date most Martian deposits of hydrated minerals. Based on CRISM spectral imagery, authors studying this depression have interpretatively identified the presence of:

- iron-rich minerals such as hematite and goethite
- Polyhydrated iron sulfates (copiapite and coquimbite), monohydrated iron sulfates (szomolnokite and possibly kieserite), hydroxylated iron sulfates (melanterite and hydronium jarosite), and possibly anhydrous iron sulfates (mikasaite).
- aluminum phyllosilicates (kaolinites like hydrated halloysite/endeillite, or perhaps a combination of kaolinite and montmorillonite)
- iron smectites (nontronite)
- opaline silica (opal-A to the diagenetically-altered opal-CT), found to be comparable in spectral signature to some Icelandic volcanic glass lapilli

Of the hydrated iron sulfate minerals observed in the basin, some of them - such as ferricopiapite - are not stable in modern Martian conditions. However, researchers have suggested that they appear to coexist because the different deposits may have been exposed to the open atmosphere at different times, and some of these minerals do only fully dehydrate under Martian conditions over the course of many years. Furthermore, opaline silica deposits observed within this depression display spectra that may occasionally suggest interpersal with the iron sulfate mineral jarosite and the phyllosilicate mineral montmorillonite. The latter material is interpreted as such from an unusual doublet shape resolved on its spectra.

The minerals in this basin were most likely formed as a result of an initially acidic hydrothermal alteration of basaltic terrain, with the dissolution of plagioclase and calcium-rich pyroxenes increasing the pH steadily and causing the other minerals to precipitate. In this basin in particular, the mafic smectite layer overlays sulfates, aluminum phyllosilicate clays, and opaline silica deposits. The order of this layering is unique to the unnamed depression and is typically reversed in most Martian contexts, with the mafic smectites forming the bottom Noachian-age layer. Some researchers have counterproposed that rather than a sequentially reversed depositional event, this basin formed in a single, highly heterogeneous event. This is not necessarily indicative of a global alterational phenomenon, but is most likely tied to a localized heat source such as a volcano or an impact crater. In 2024, scientists Pascal Lee and Sourabh Shubham found evidence from CRISM, the HiRISE camera, and the Mars Orbital Laser Altimeter that this heat source was a volcano near the northeast end of the labyrinthus that they dubbed Noctis Mons, which would be the seventh-highest mountain on Mars at 9,028 m (29,619 ft), and that the eastern part of its base was home to multiple glaciers with potential for hosting life, which could make it a highly valuable candidate target for astrobiology missions.

Calcium-rich pyroxenes have been spectrally observed elsewhere in the northern reaches of the Noctis Labyrinthus fracture zone.

== Observational history ==
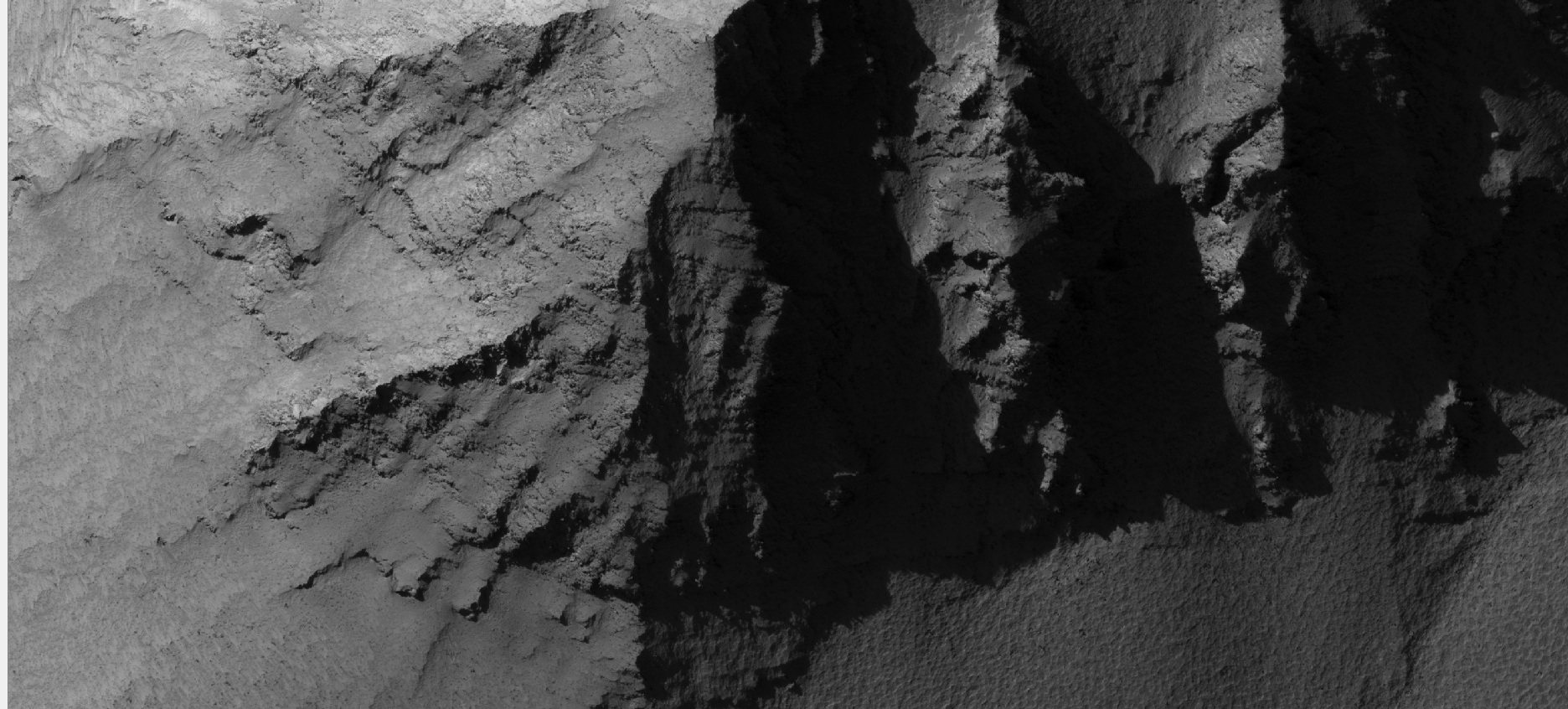
Section of layers near top of Noctis Labyrinthus, as seen by HiRISE under HiWish program.

In 1980, Philippe Masson of the University of Paris-Sud offered an integrated interpretation of the structural geochronology of Valles Marineris, Noctis Labyrinthus, and Claritas Fossae in light of imagery from Mariner 9 and the Viking Orbiter.

In 2003, Daniel Mège (Pierre and Marie Curie University), Anthony C. Cook (University of Nottingham and the Smithsonian Institution), Erwan Garel (University of Maine in France), Yves Lagabrielle (University of Western Brittany), and Marie-Hélène Cormier (Columbia University) proposed a model for rifting on Mars initiated by the deflation of magma chambers, forming pit crater chains tracking directionally with simple graben. The researchers offered the first theoretical explanation as to how the chasmata of Noctis Labyrinthus formed.

In 2012, a collaboration of French researchers Patrick Thollot, Nicolas Mangold, Véronique Ansan, and Stéphan Le Mouélic (University of Nantes), along with a cadre of American researchers including John F. Mustard (Brown University), Ralph E. Milliken (University of Notre Dame), and Scott Murchie (Applied Physics Laboratory) reported on an unnamed basin in southeastern Noctis Labyrinthus showing an extremely wide assemblage of minerals known to form across a wide range of pH and water availability conditions. The pit is the only one of its kind in Noctis Labyrinthus and has a greater variability than almost any other location yet observed on the planet. Using CRISM spectral data on HiRISE visual images for context, the researchers proposed that the variability of this pit is a result of hydrothermal alteration, with the dissolution of extant calcium-rich minerals (e.g. plagioclase) diminishing the acidity and thus kinds of minerals observed. The variability was explained without evoking a global warm and wet Martian climatic condition for the period.

== See also ==
- Climate of Mars
- Fossa (geology)
- Geology of Mars
- Groundwater on Mars
- HiRISE
- HiWish program
- List of quadrangles on Mars
- MOC Public Targeting Program
- Volcanism on Mars
- Water on Mars
