= Labeatis Fossae =

Fossae on Mars

- Labeatis Fossae, as seen by THEMIS.
- Coordinates: 25.5°N 84.1°W
- Naming: a previously named feature at 30N, 75W

Labeatis Fossae is a large trough in the Lunae Palus quadrangle of Mars, located at 25.5° N and 84.1° W. It is 1,560.0 km long and was named after a previously named feature at 30N, 75W.

The term "fossae" is used to indicate large troughs when using geographical terminology related to Mars. Troughs, sometimes also called grabens, form when the crust is stretched until it breaks, which forms two breaks with a middle section moving down, leaving steep cliffs along the sides. Sometimes, a line of pits form as materials collapse into a void that forms from the stretching.

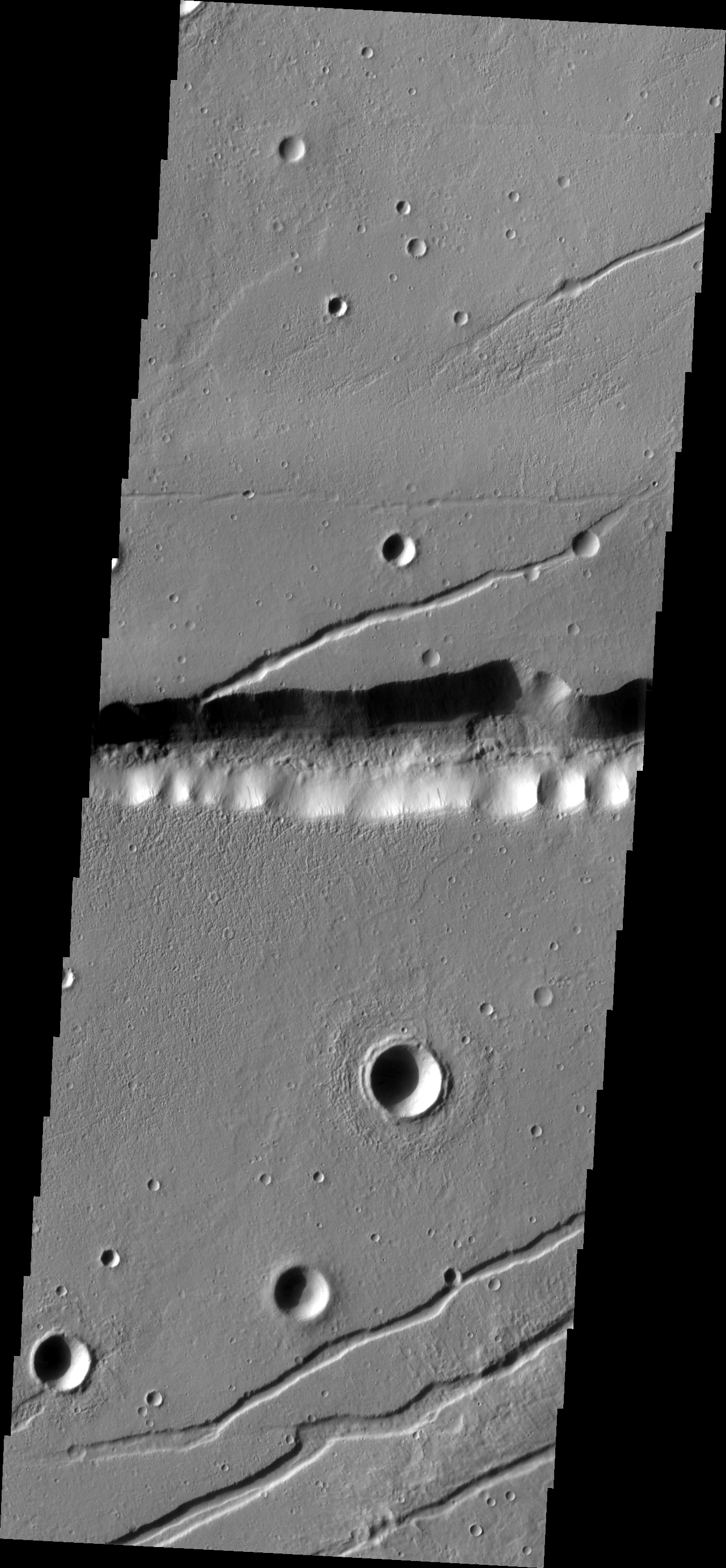
Labeatis Fossae in context, as seen by THEMIS.

== See also ==
- Fossa (geology)
- Geology of Mars
