= Daedalia Planum =

Planum on Mars

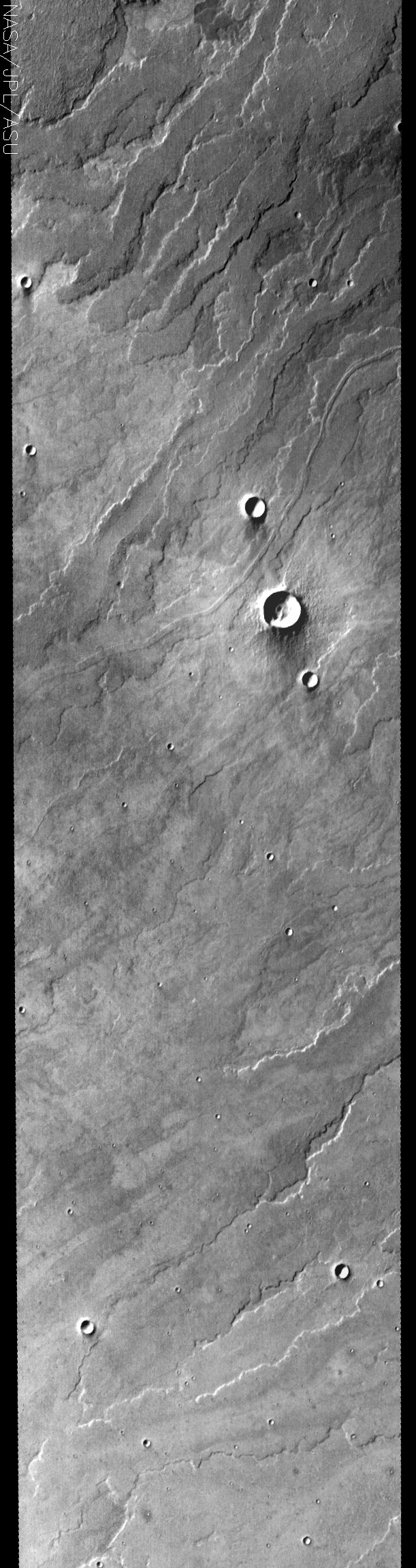
- Coordinates: 21.8°S 128.0°W

Daedalia Planum is a plain on Mars located south of Arsia Mons at 21.8°S 128.0°W and appears to be relatively featureless plain with multiple lava flows and small craters. It is mostly in the Memnonia quadrangle, but parts are in Tharsis quadrangle and Phoenicis Lacus quadrangle. Modern imagery suggests that it may more accurately be called a "fluctus" rather than a "planum".

There is evidence that an ancient 4500 km-diameter impact basin formed in the Noachian epoch may be centered in Daedalia Planum.

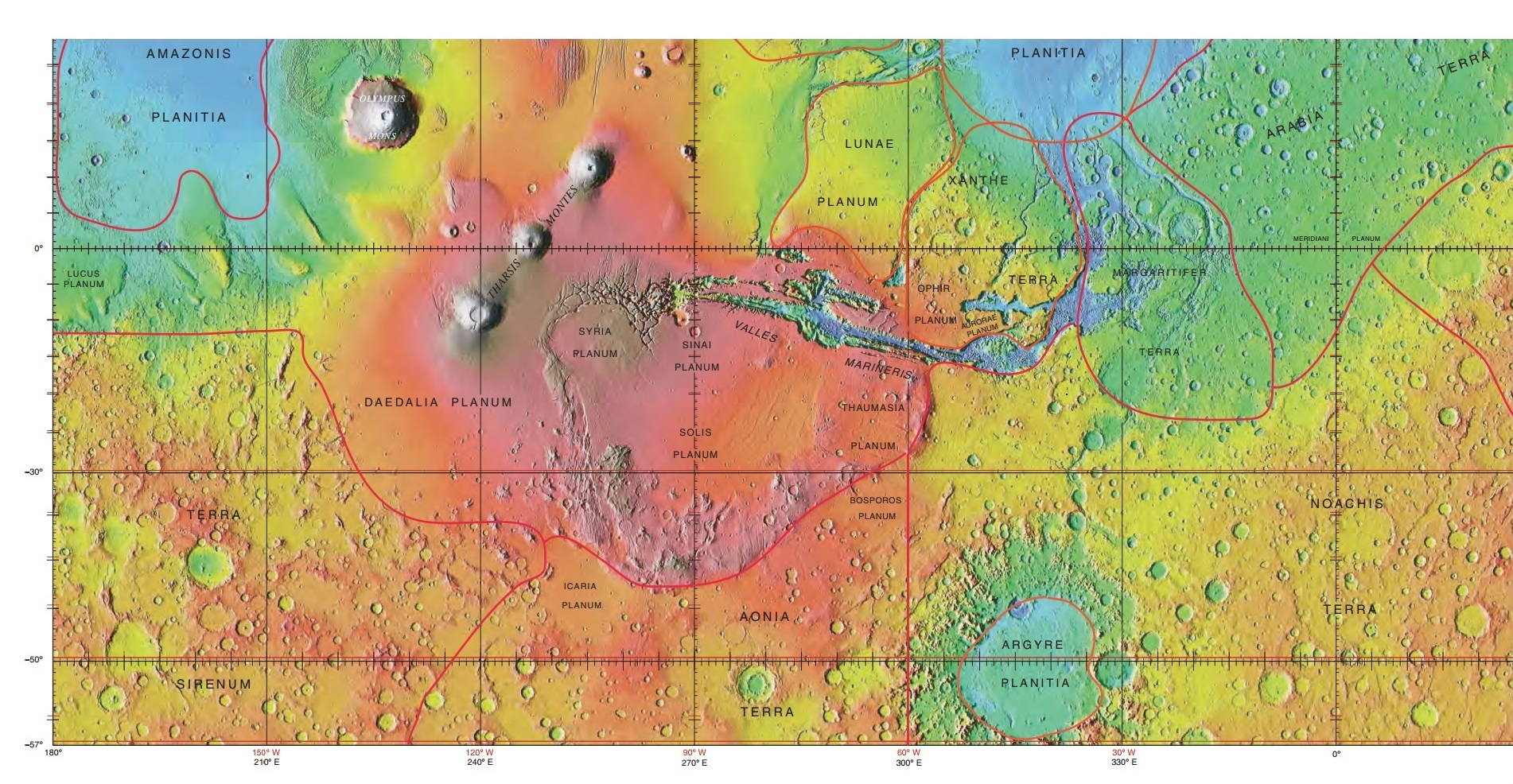
MOLA map showing boundaries of Daedalia Planum and other regions. Colors show elevations.

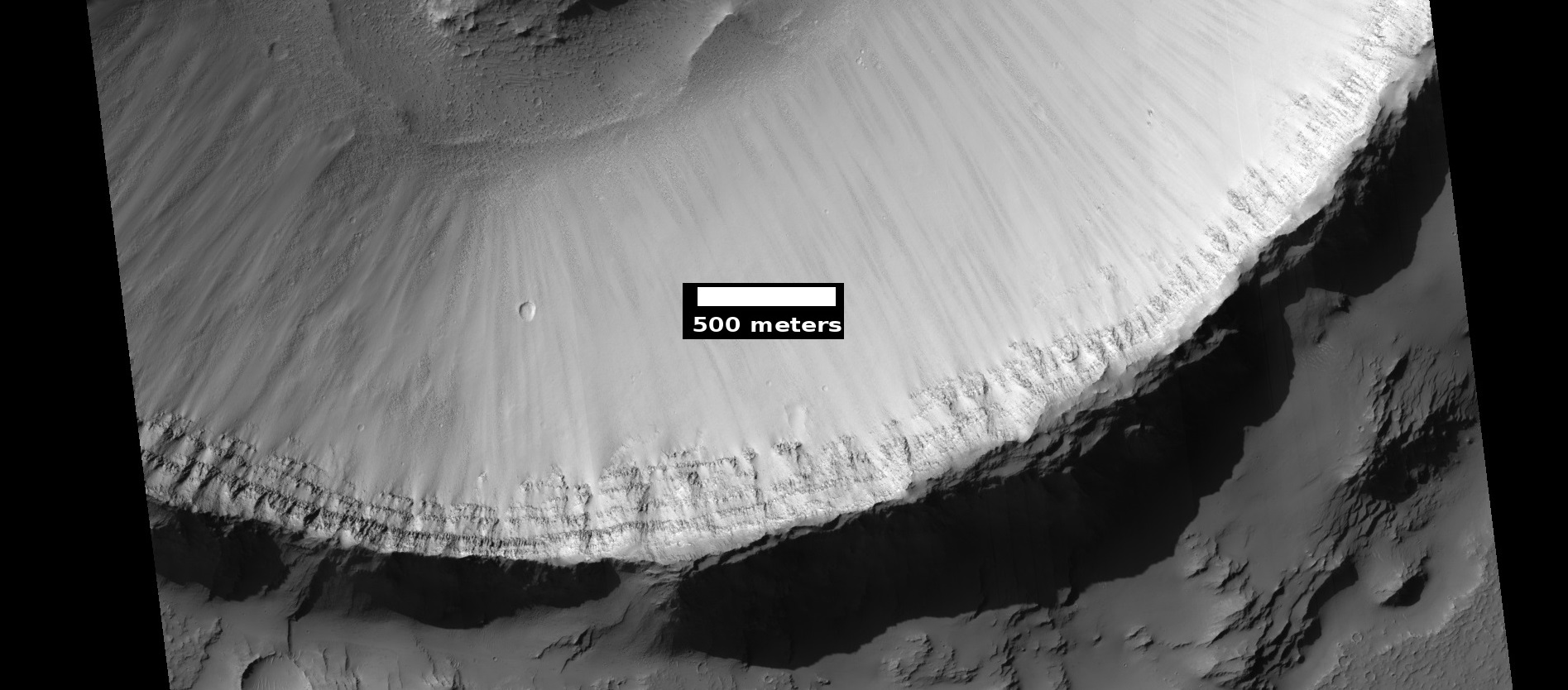
Layers in crater wall, as seen by HiRISE under HiWish program

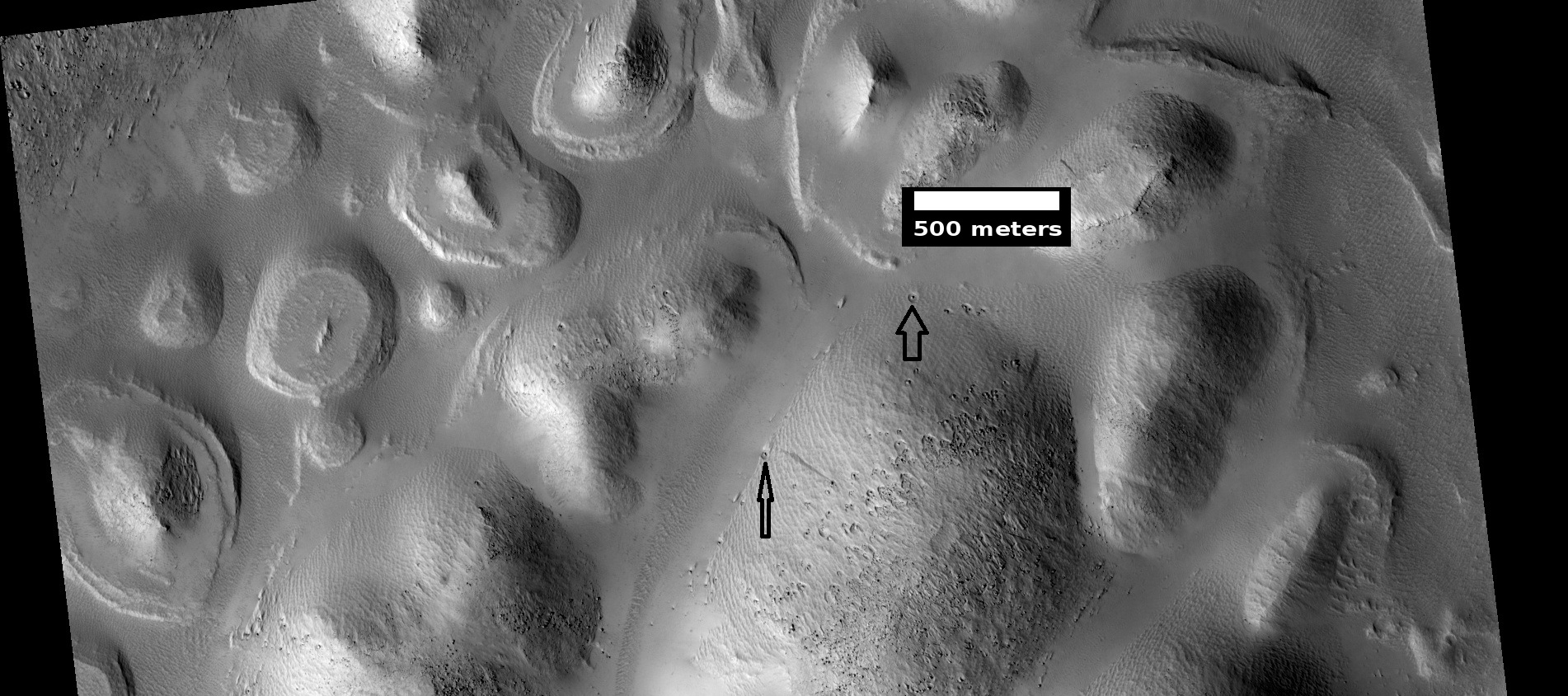
Layers exposed at the base of a group of buttes in Mangala Valles in Memnonia quadrangle, as seen by HiRISE under HiWish program. Arrows point to boulders sitting in pits. The pits may have formed by winds, heat from the boulders melting ground ice, or some other process.
