= Tempe Fossae =

Fossae on Mars

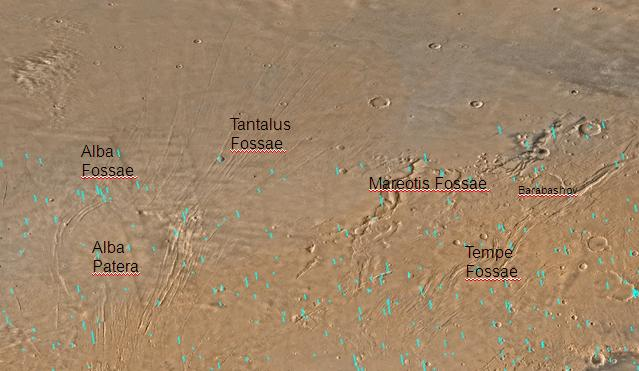
- Map of Arcadia quadrangle with major features labeled. Several large cracks called fossae are in this area.
- Coordinates: 40.2°N 71.4°W
- Naming: an albedo feature at 40N, 70W

The Tempe Fossae are a group of troughs in the Arcadia quadrangle of Mars, located at 40.2° north latitude and 71.4° west longitude. They are about 2,000 km long and were named after an albedo feature at 40N, 70W.

The term "fossae" is used to indicate large troughs when using geographical terminology related to Mars. Troughs, sometimes also called grabens, form when the crust is stretched until it breaks, which forms two breaks with a middle section moving down, leaving steep cliffs along the sides. Sometimes, a line of pits form as materials collapse into a void that forms from the stretching.

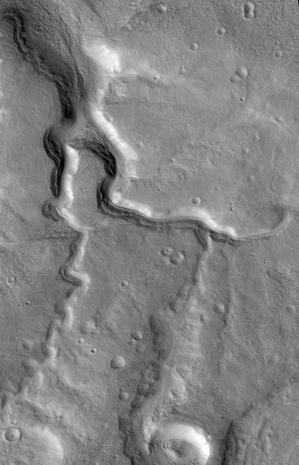
Tempe Fossae sinuous channel, as seen by HiRISE.

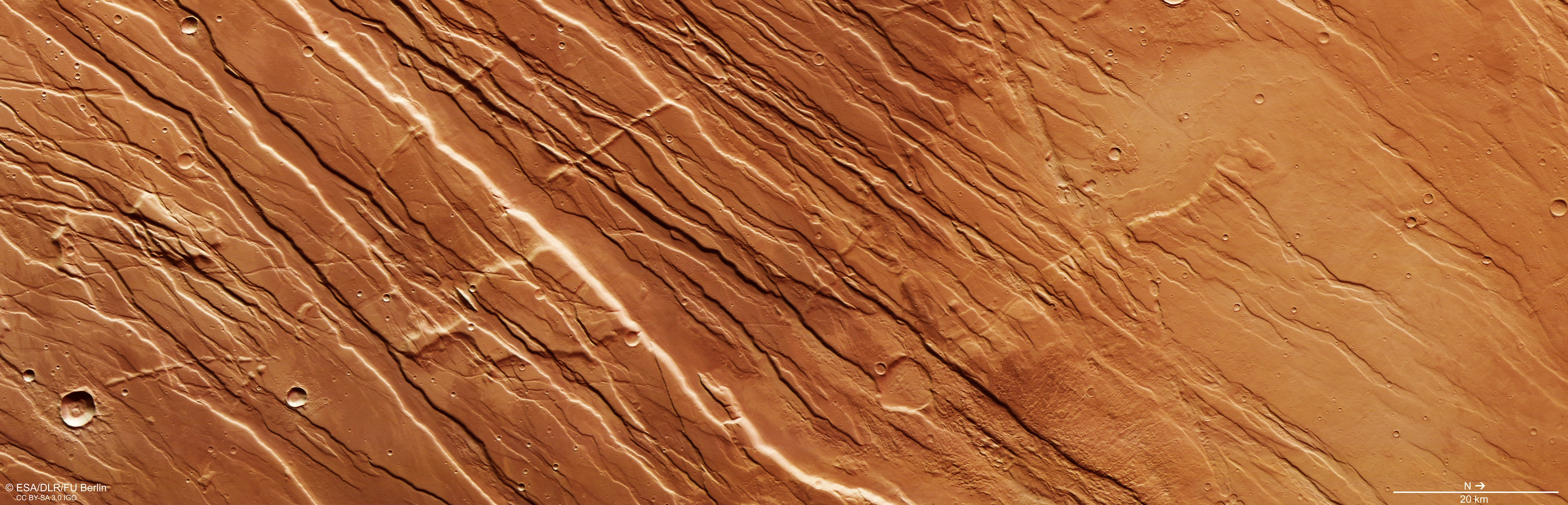
Grabens and horsts, as seen by Mars Express' High Resolution Stereo Camera.

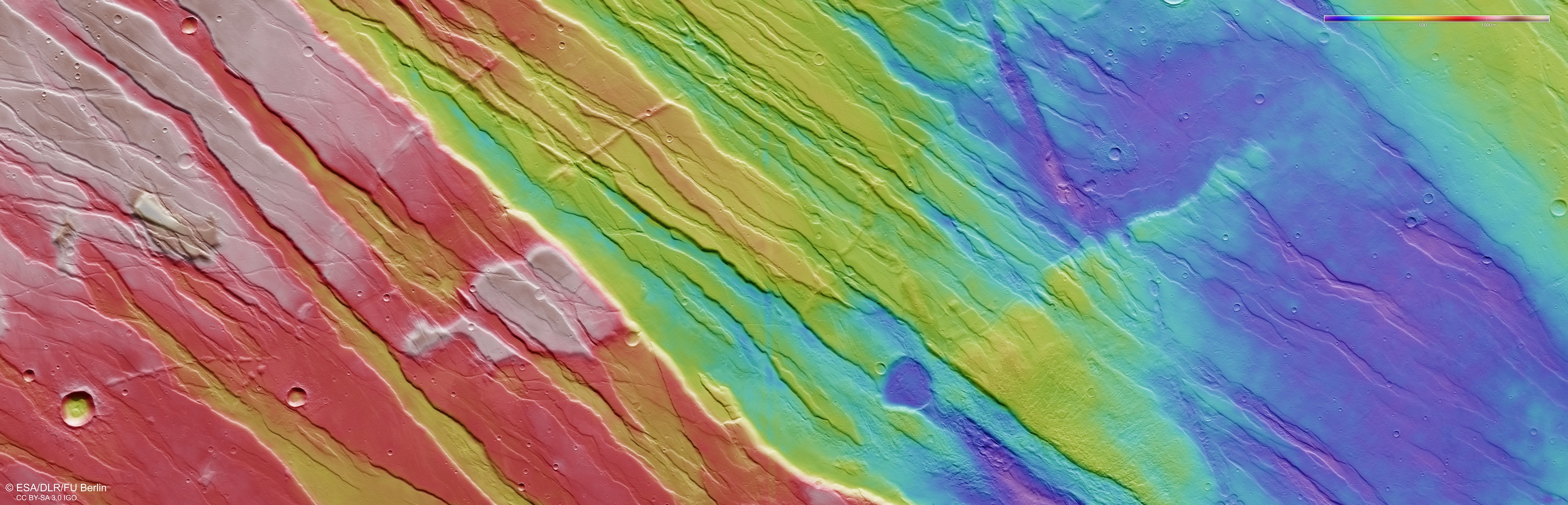
Topographic view by HRSC

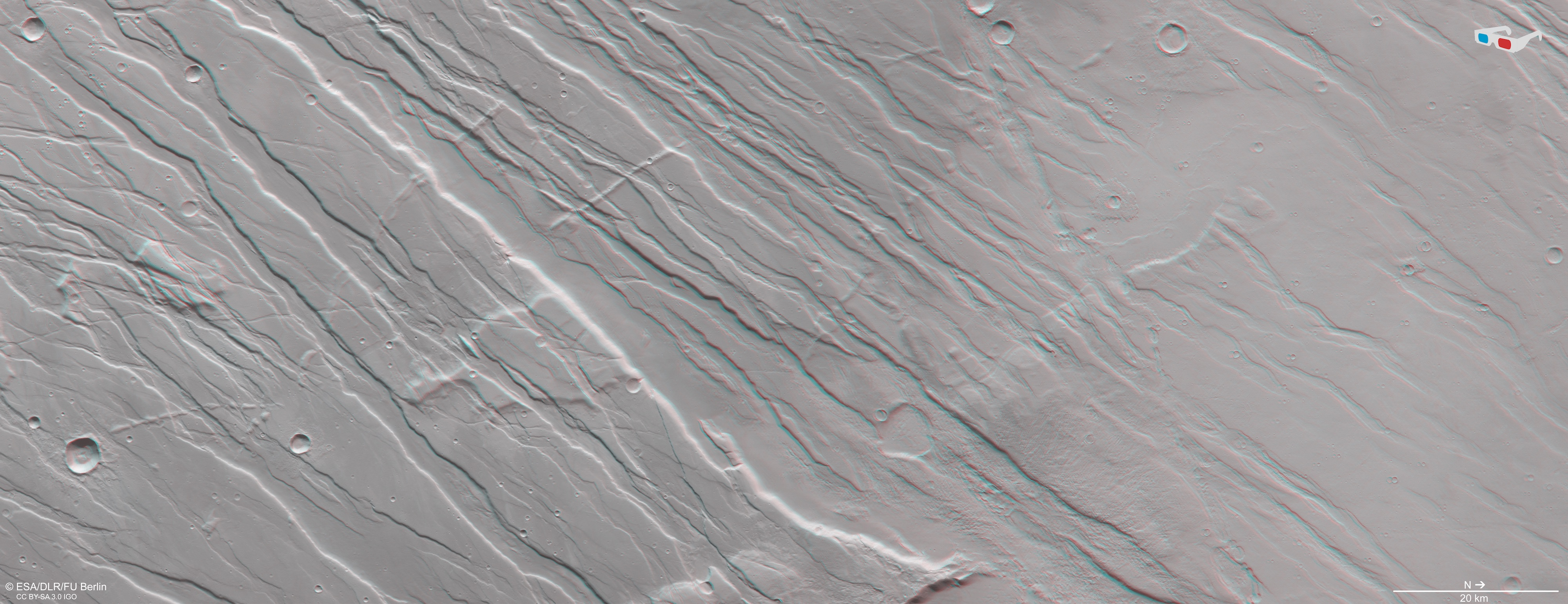
3D anaglyph by HRSC

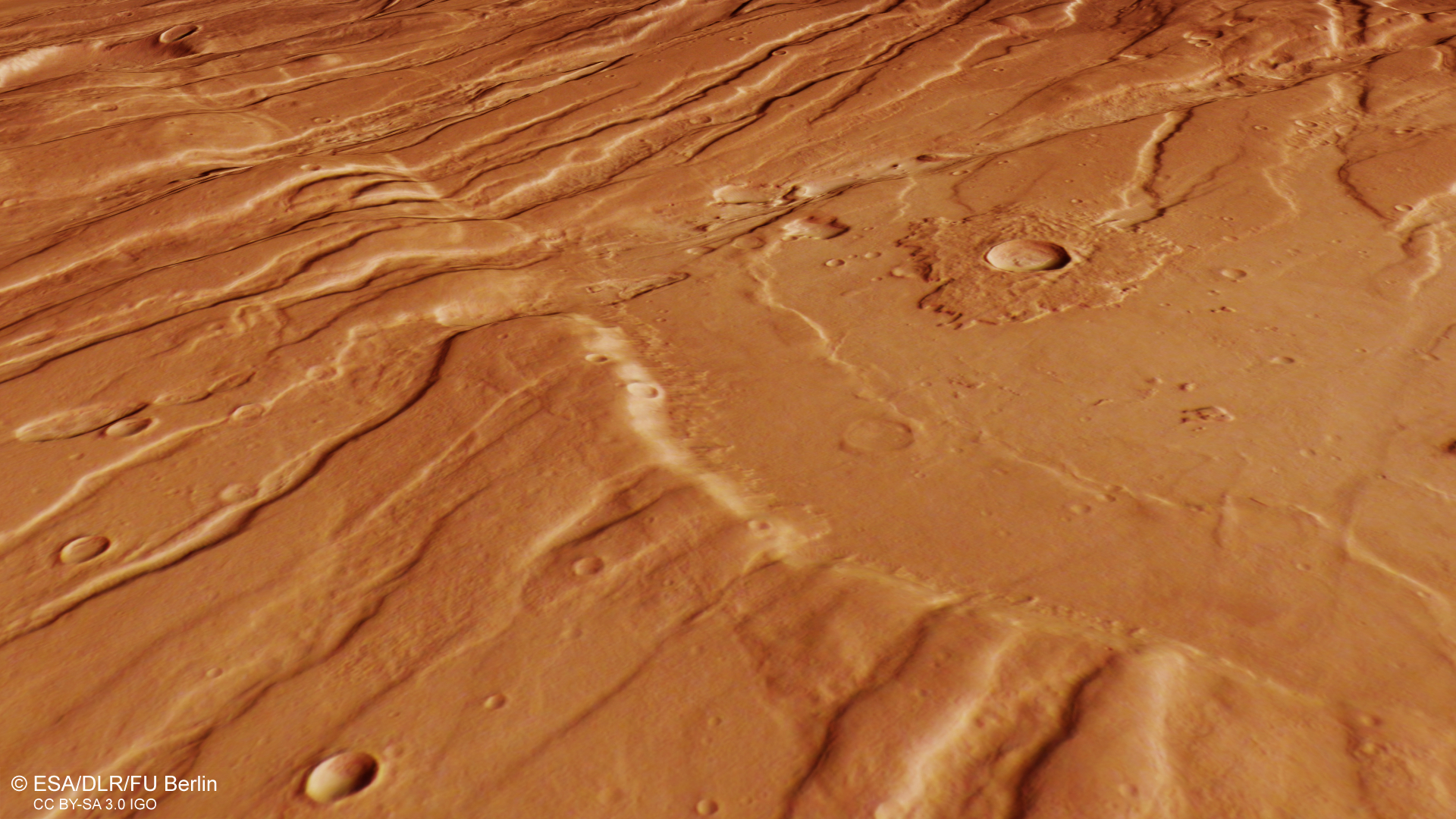
Perspective view by HRSC

== See also ==
- Fossa (geology)
- Geology of Mars
- HiRISE
