= Marte Vallis =

Vallis on Mars

- Marte Vallis based on THEMIS day-time image
- Coordinates: 15°N 176.5°W

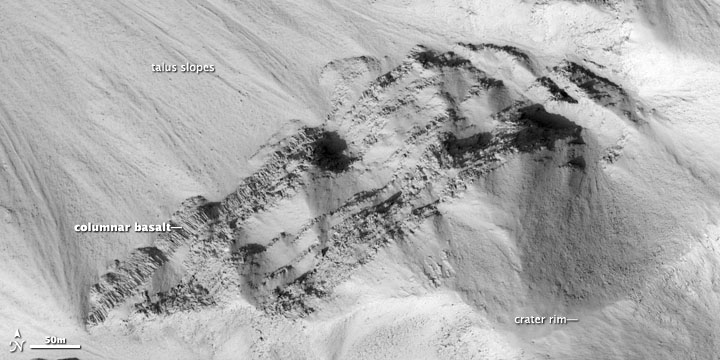
Columnar jointing in basalt, Marte Vallis. Image courtesy High Resolution Imaging Science Experiment, University of Arizona.

Marte Vallis is a valley in the Amazonis quadrangle of Mars, located at 15 North and 176.5 West. It is 185 km long and was named for the Spanish word for "Mars". It has been identified as an outflow channel, carved in the geological past by catastrophic release of water from aquifers beneath the Martian surface. The surface material is thought to have been created out of 'a'ā and pāhoehoe lava flows from the Elysium volcanic province in the west.

Marte Vallis is the site of the first discovery of columnar jointing on Mars. Columnar jointing often forms when basalt lava cools.

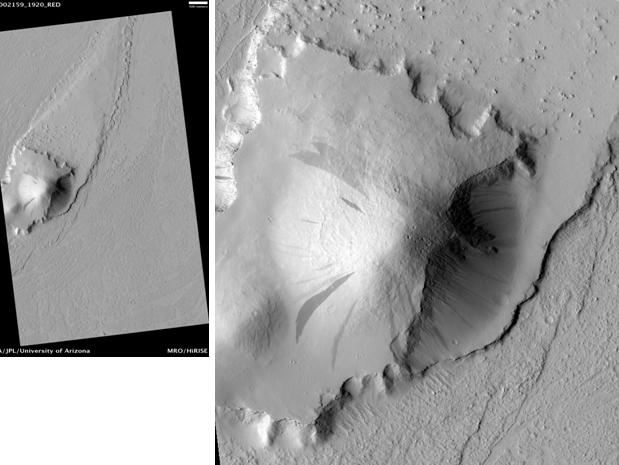
Streamlined Island in Marte Vallis, as seen by HiRISE. The enlarged image gives a good view of dark slope streaks. Island is just to the west of Pettit Crater. Scale bar is 500 meters long.

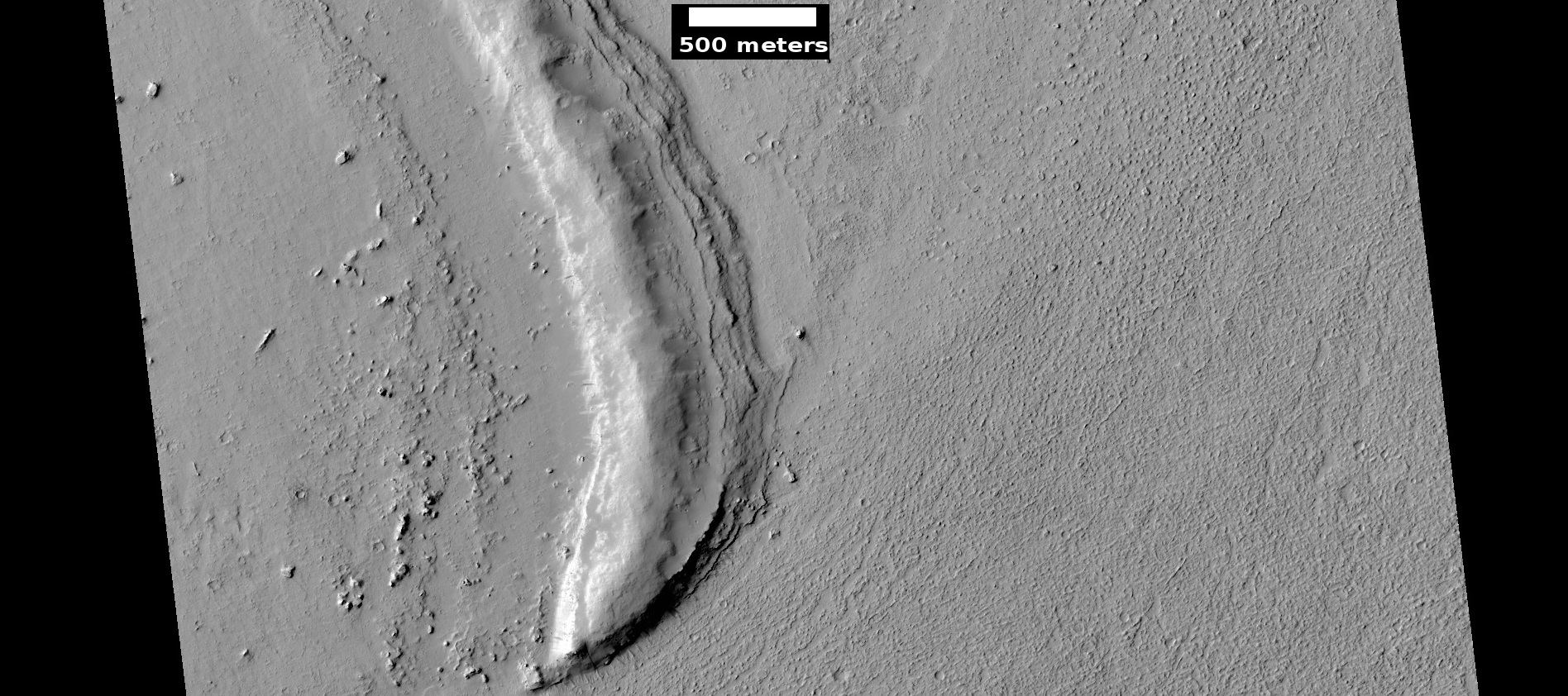
Layers in old crater rim, in Marte Vallis as seen by HiRISE under HiWish program

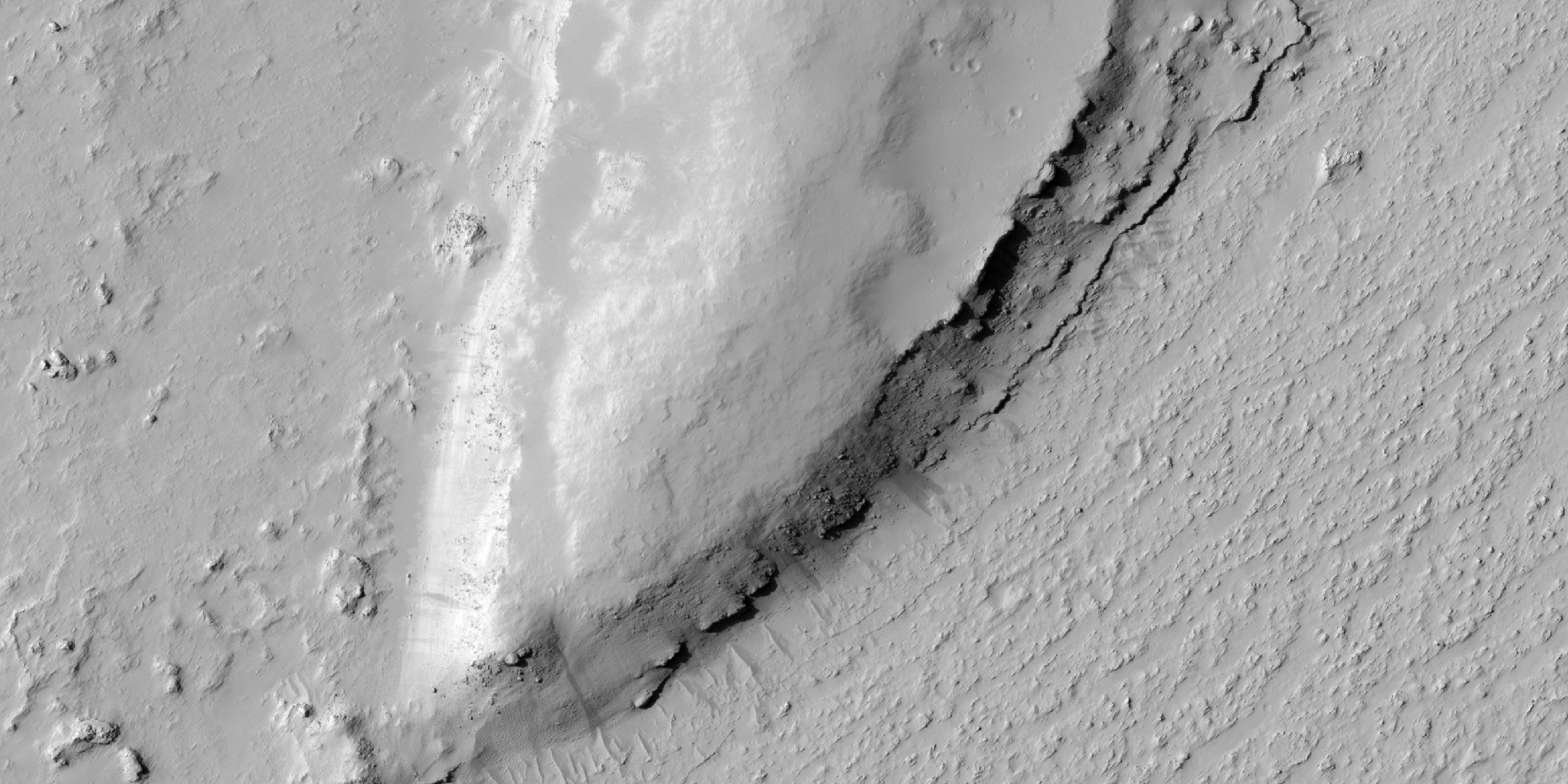
Close view of layers from previous image, as seen by HiRISE under HiWish program Some dark slope streaks are visible.

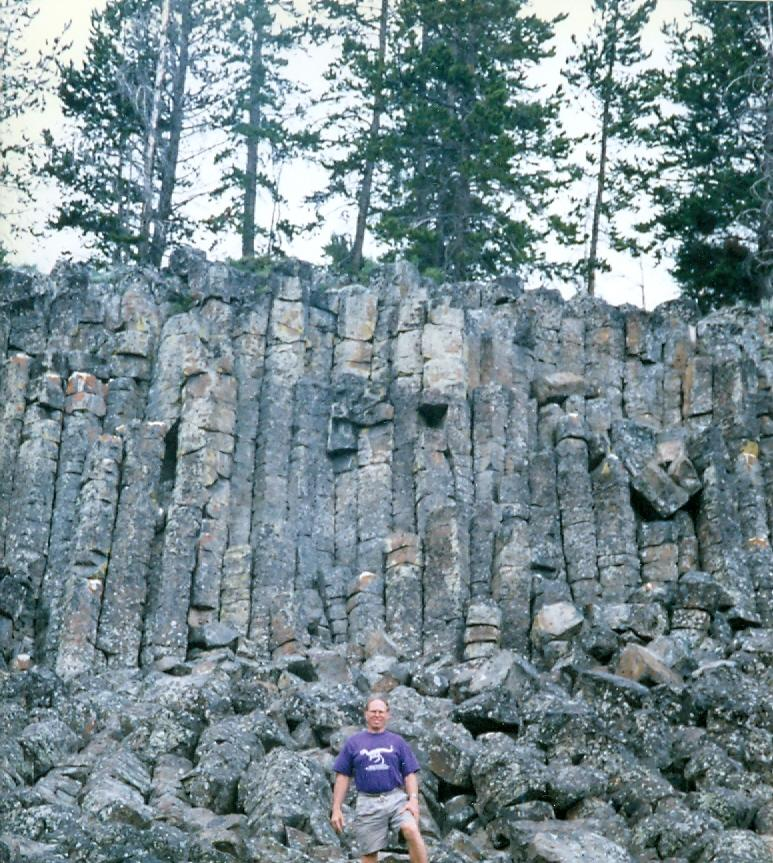
Columinar Jointing in Yellowstone National Park.

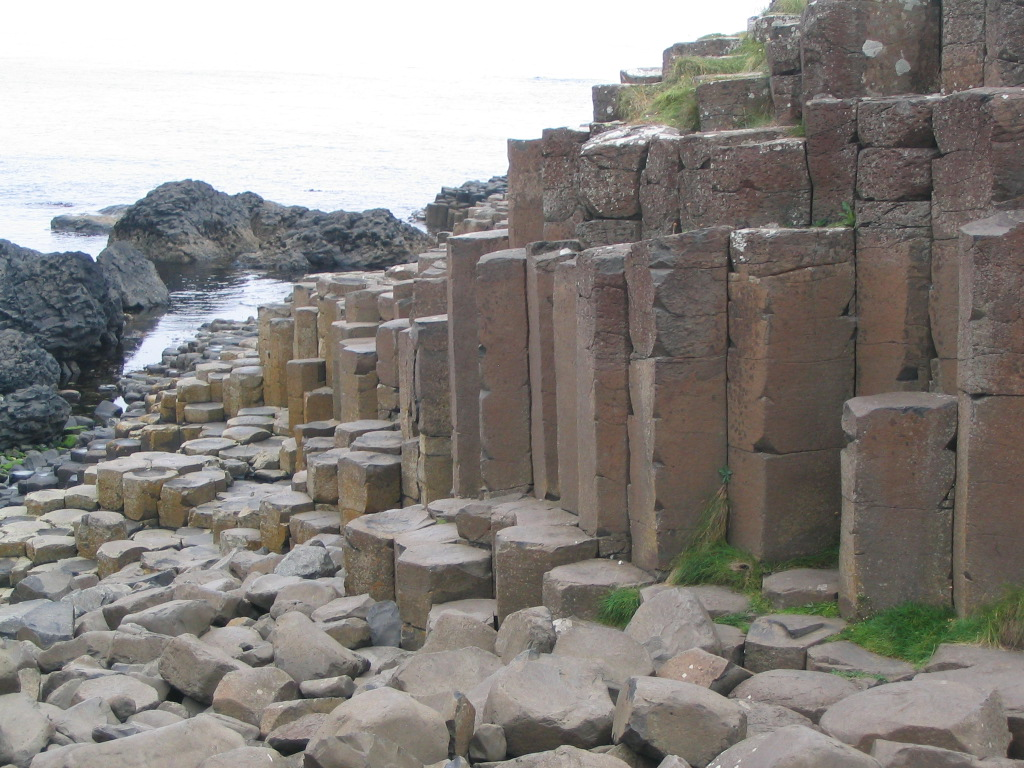
Columnar jointing in the basalt of the Giant's Causeway in Northern Ireland

== See also ==
- Columnar jointing
- Geology of Mars
- HiWish program
- HiRISE
- Amazonis quadrangle
- Vallis
