= Solis Planum =

Plateau on Mars

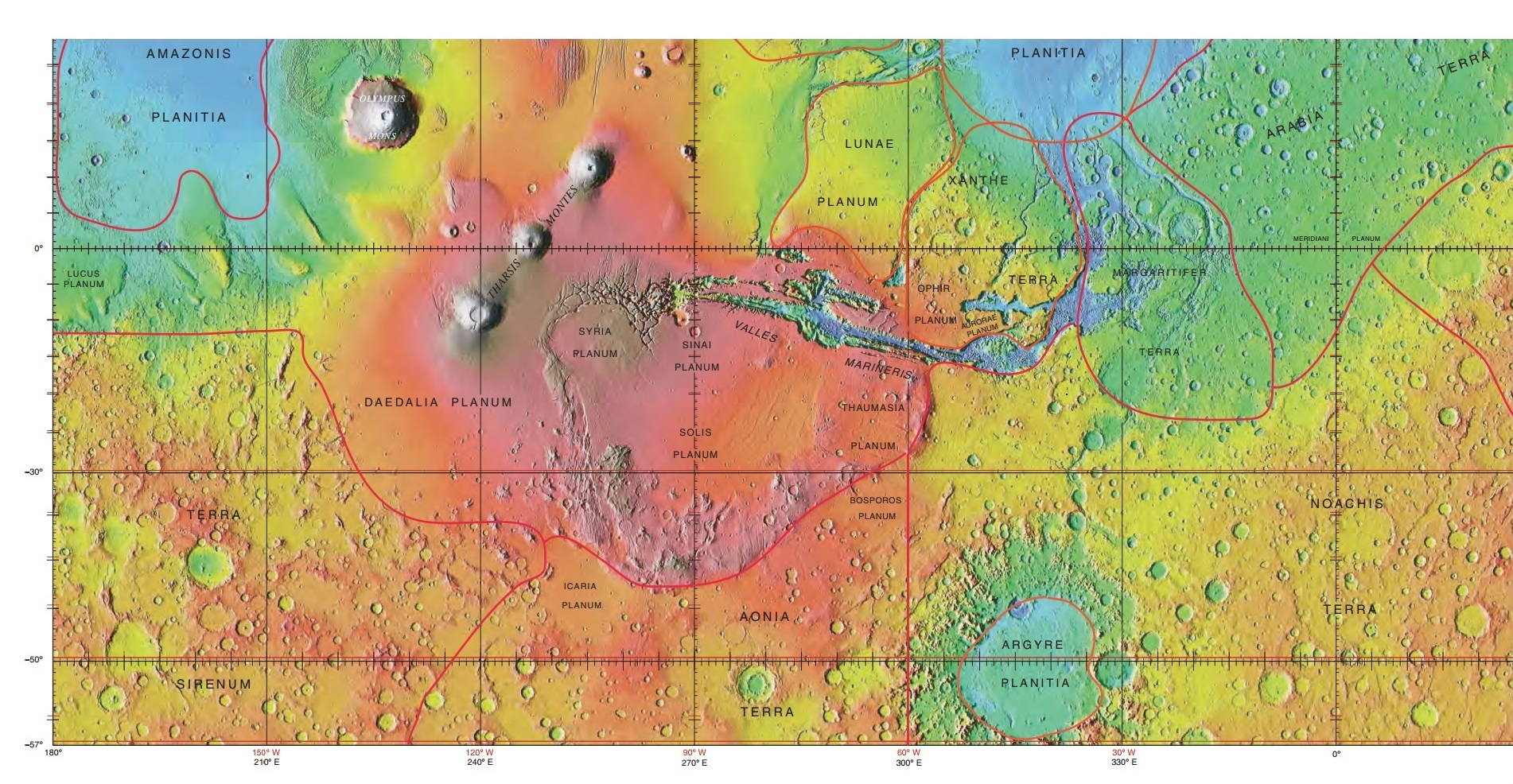
MOLA map showing Solis Planum and other regions. Colors indicate elevations.

Solis Planum is a planum on Mars which has a diameter of 1811.23 km. Its center latitude is 26.4 S and its center longitude is 270.33 E. Solis Planum was named after a classic albedo feature name, and its name was approved in 1973.

== Gallery ==
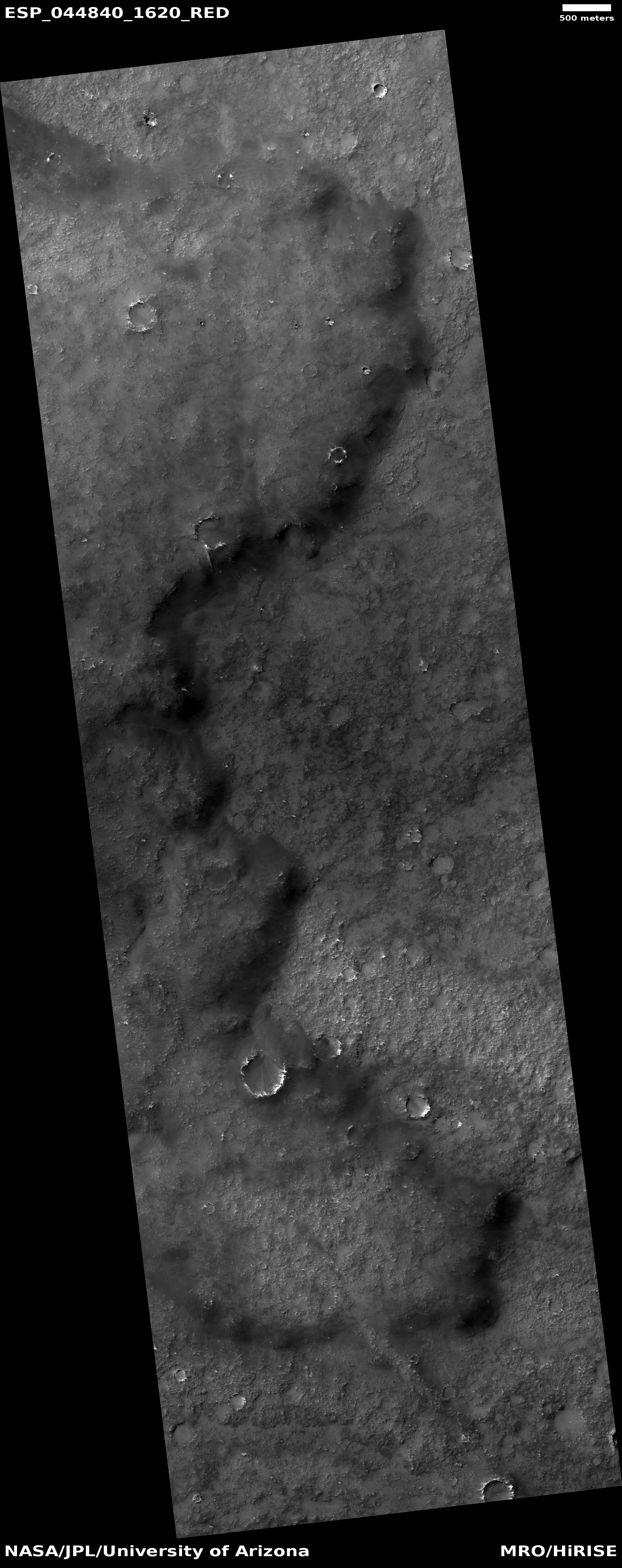
Edge of lava flow, as seen by HiRISE under HiWish program

== See also ==
- Phoenicis Lacus quadrangle
- Volcanism on Mars
