= Fossa (planetary nomenclature) =

Long, narrow, shallow depression

In planetary nomenclature, a fossa /ˈfɒsə/ (pl. fossae /ˈfɒsiː/) is a long, narrow depression (trough) on the surface of an extraterrestrial body, such as a planet or moon. The term, which means "ditch" or "trench" in Latin, is not a geological term as such but a descriptor term used by the United States Geological Survey (USGS) and the International Astronomical Union (IAU) for topographic features whose geology or geomorphology is uncertain due to lack of data or knowledge of the exact processes that formed them. Fossae are believed to be the result of a number of geological processes, such as faulting or subsidence. Many fossae on Mars are probably graben.

== On Mars ==
The Tharsis quadrangle is home to large troughs (long narrow depressions) called fossae in the geographical language used for Mars. Troughs form when the crust is stretched until it breaks. The stretching can be due to the large weight of a nearby volcano. Studies have shown that the volcanoes of Tharsis caused most of the major fossae on Mars. The stress that caused the fossae and other tectonic features is centered in Noctis Labyrinthus, at 4 S and 253 E. But the center has moved somewhat over time. Fossae/pit craters are common near volcanoes in the Tharsis and Elysium system of volcanoes. A trough often has two breaks with a middle section moving down, leaving steep cliffs along the sides; such a trough is called a graben. Lake George, in northern New York State, is a lake that sits in a graben. Sometimes, a line of pits form as material collapse into a void that results from the stretching. Pit craters do not have rims or ejecta around them, like impact craters do. Studies have found that on Mars a fault may be as deep as 5 km, that is the break in the rock goes down to 5 km. Moreover, the crack or fault sometimes widens or dilates. This widening causes a void to form with a relatively high volume. When material slides into the void, a pit crater or a pit crater chain forms. On Mars, individual pit craters can join to form chains or even to form troughs that are sometimes scalloped. Other ideas have been suggested for the formation of fossae and pit craters. There is evidence that they are associated with dikes of magma. Magma might move along, under the surface, breaking the rock and more importantly melting ice. The resulting action would cause a crack to form at the surface. Dikes caused both by tectonic stretching (extension) and by dikes are found in Iceland. Pit craters are not common on Earth. Sinkholes, where the ground falls into a hole (sometimes in the middle of a town) resemble pit craters on Mars. However, on the Earth these holes are caused by limestone being dissolved thereby causing a void.

Knowledge of the locations and formation mechanisms of pit craters and fossae is important for the future colonization of Mars because they may be reservoirs of water.

== External resources ==
- Fossae on Mars
- Fossae on Venus
- Fossae on the Moon
- Fossae on Enceladus
- Fossae on Ganymede
