= HiWish program =

NASA program for public suggestions for MRO images

HiWish is a program created by NASA to request a location for the HiRISE camera on the Mars Reconnaissance Orbiter to photograph. It was started in January 2010. In the first months of the program, 3000 people signed up to use HiWish. The first images were released in April 2010. Over 12000 suggestions were made by the public; suggestions were made for targets in each of the 30 quadrangles of Mars. HiRISE has taken over 100,000 images as of October 7, 2025.

== See also ==
- Climate of Mars
- Common surface features of Mars
- Geology of Mars
- Glaciers
- Glaciers on Mars
- Barchan
- Groundwater on Mars
- Martian gullies
- Mud volcano
- Linear ridge networks
- Water on Mars
- Yardangs on Mars
