= Sluffing =

Sluffing has multiple meanings:

- Loose snow avalanche, non cohesive snow falling down a slope.
- Truancy, absence from schooling.
- Sluffing (cards), playing cards of little or no value in a card game.
