= Diacria quadrangle =

Map of Mars

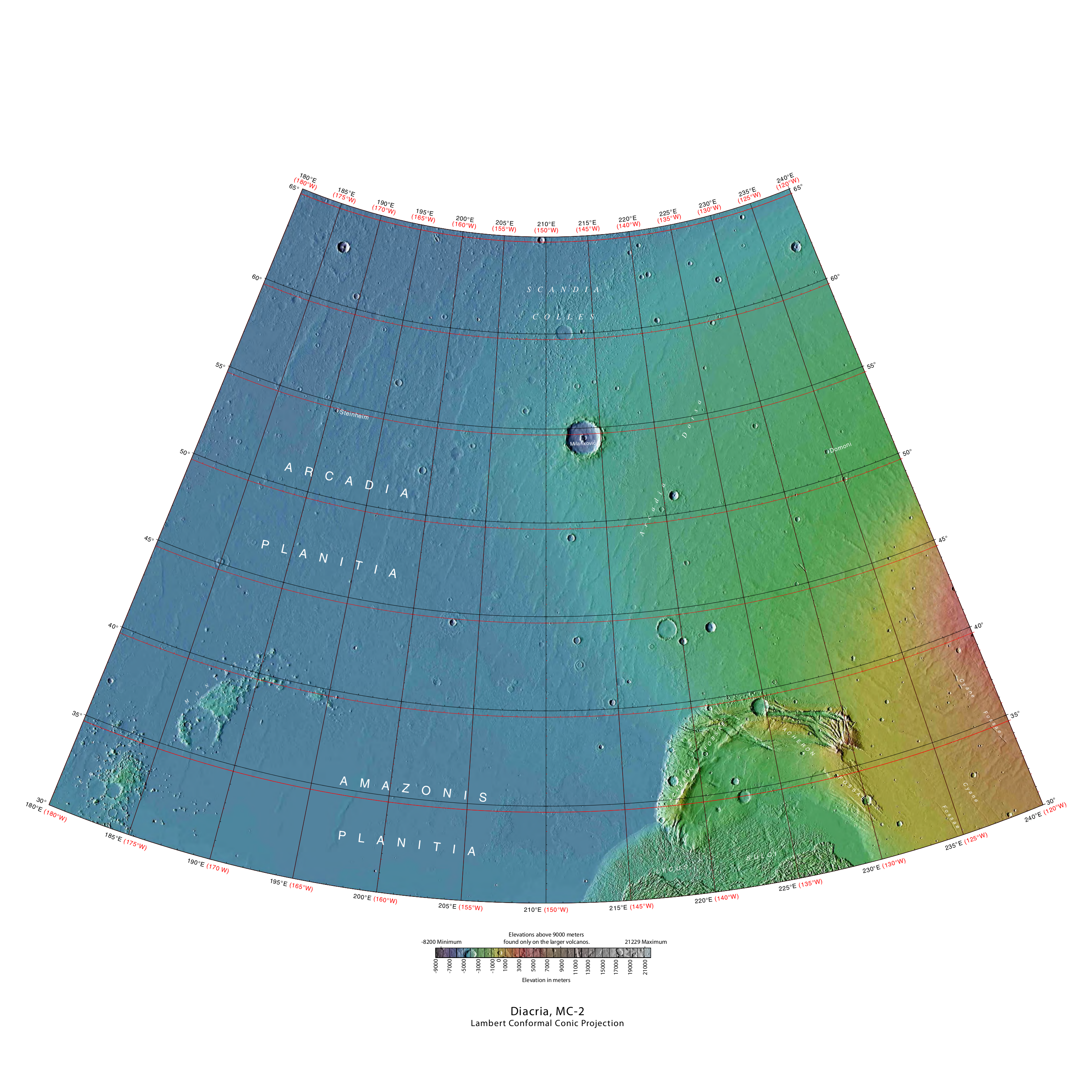
- Elevation map of Diacria quadrangle from Mars Orbiter Laser Altimeter (MOLA) data
- Coordinates: 47.5°N 150°W
- Eponym: Diacria highlands around Marathon in Greece

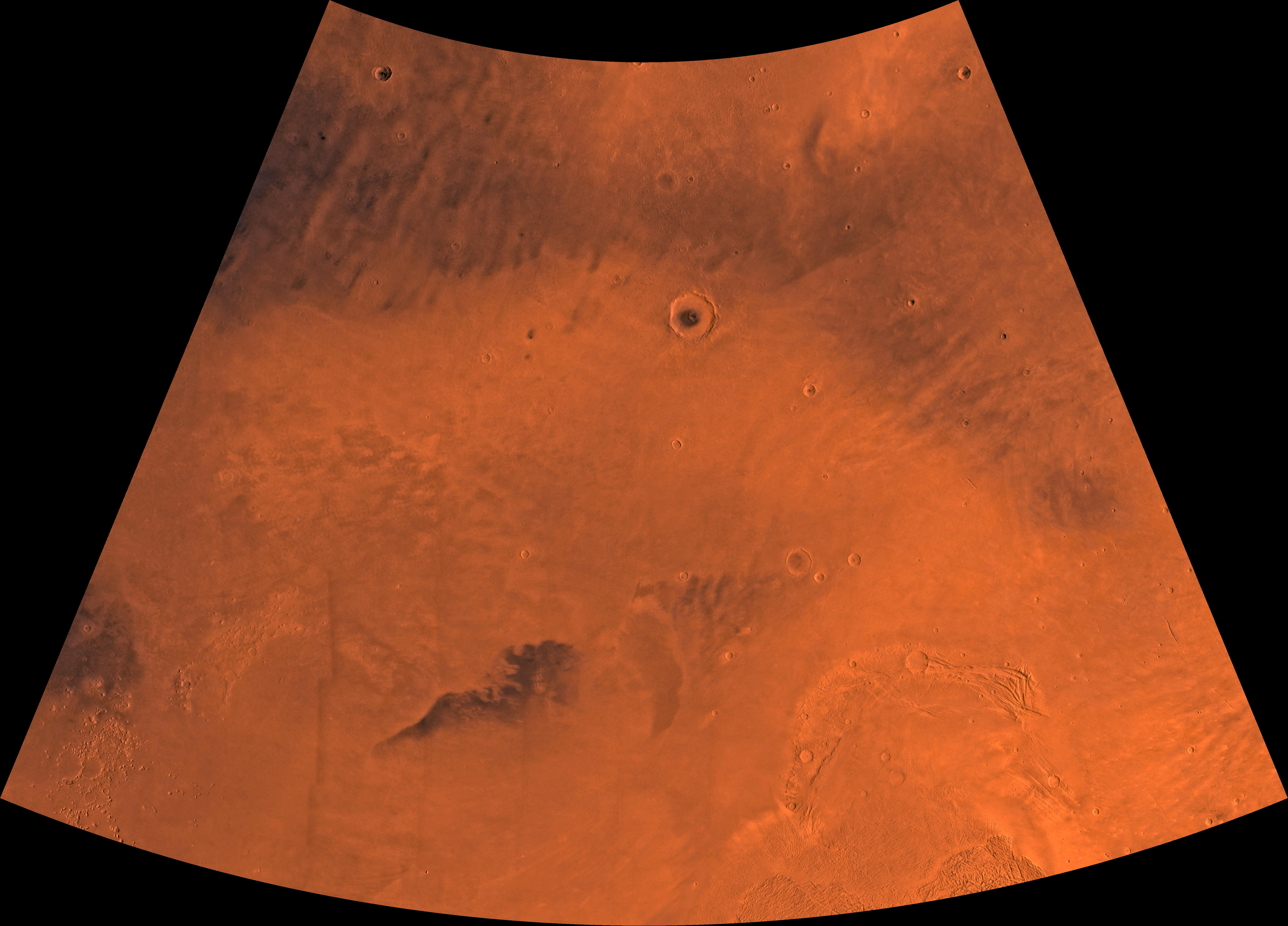
Image of the Diacria Quadrangle (MC-2). The southeastern part is marked by aureole deposits of the largest known volcano in the Solar System, Olympus Mons.

The Diacria quadrangle is one of a series of 30 quadrangle maps of Mars used by the United States Geological Survey (USGS) Astrogeology Research Program. The quadrangle is located in the northwestern portion of Mars' western hemisphere and covers 180° to 240° east longitude (120° to 180° west longitude) and 30° to 65° north latitude. The quadrangle uses a Lambert conformal conic projection at a nominal scale of 1:5,000,000 (1:5M). The Diacria quadrangle is also referred to as MC-2 (Mars Chart-2). The Diacria quadrangle covers parts of Arcadia Planitia and Amazonis Planitia.

The southern and northern borders of the Diacria quadrangle are approximately 3,065 km (1,905 mi) and 1,500 km (930 mi) wide, respectively. The north to south distance is about 2,050 km (1,270 mi) (slightly less than the length of Greenland). The quadrangle covers an approximate area of 4.9 million square km, or a little over 3% of Mars' surface area. The Phoenix lander's landing site (68.22° N, 234.25° E) lies about 186 km (116 mi) north of the northeastern quarter of the Diacria quadrangle. The landscape viewed by the Phoenix lander is probably representative of a large portion of the terrain in the northern Diacria quadrangle.

== Etymology ==
Diacria is the name of a telescopic albedo feature located at 48° N and 190° E on Mars. The feature was named by Greek astronomer E. M. Antoniadi in 1930 after Diacria, the highlands around Marathon in north-west Attica, Greece. The name was approved by the International Astronomical Union (IAU) in 1958.

== Physiography and geology ==
The Diacria quadrangle is located at the northwestern edge of the Tharsis volcanic plateau. Topographic, volcanic, and tectonic features associated with the large volcanoes Olympus Mons (south of map area) and Alba Mons (east of map area) characterize the southeastern and east central portions of the quadrangle. The northern and western areas of the quadrangle lie in the northern lowland plains of Mars and cover portions of Amazonis Planitia (in the south), Arcadia Planitia (west central) and Vastitas Borealis (in the north). The large crater Milankovič (118.4 km in diameter) is located in the north central portion of the quadrangle at 54.7° N, 213.3° E.

Elevation data from the Mars Orbital Laser Altimeter (MOLA) instrument on the Mars Global Surveyor spacecraft shows that the regional terrain slopes gently downward to the northwest, with the highest elevation about 3.5 km (2.2 mi) above datum (Mars "sea level") on the western flank of the Alba Mons volcano in the southeastern portion of the quadrangle. The lowest points in the quadrangle are about 4.5 km below datum (-4,500 m) in Vastitas Borealis in the northwest corner. The regional relief is thus about 8 km, but at a local scale, slopes are very shallow; the portion of Amazonis Planitia in the south central part of the quadrangle contains some of the flattest terrain on the entire planet.

== Placeholder ==
The western flank of the Alba Mons volcano makes up the eastern and southeastern edge of the quadrangle. In terms of area, Alba Mons (formerly, Alba Patera) is the largest volcanic feature on Mars. The flank has a very low slope (l° or less) and is characterized by lava flows and an outwardly radiating array of ridges and channels. Some of the channels have a drainage pattern that resembles that formed by rain water on the slopes of terrestrial volcanoes. However, many other channels on the flanks of Alba Mons were clearly formed by flowing lava. The western flank of the volcano also contains some NW-SE trending grabens (Cyane Fossae). An image from High Resolution Imaging Science Experiment (HiRISE) on the Mars Reconnaissance Orbiter (MRO) beautifully shows a line of rimless pit craters in Cyane Fossae. The pits may have formed by the collapse of surface materials into open fractures created as magma intruded the subsurface rock to form dikes.

=== Acheron Fossae ===
Near the southeast corner of the quadrangle (37° N, 225° E) lies a southward sloping, semicircular block of ancient, heavily cratered, highland crust that is dissected by numerous, arcuate troughs (Acheron Fossae).

=== Lycus Sulci (Olympus Mons Aureole) ===
Lycus Sulci (24.6° N, 219° E) is the name applied to the northwestern portion of a larger terrain feature that partially encircles Olympus Mons and extends up to 750 km from the giant shield volcano's base. This feature, called the Olympus Mons aureole, consists of several large lobes and has a distinctive corrugated or grooved surface texture. East of Olympus Mons, the aureole is partially covered by lava flows, but where it is exposed it goes by different names (Gigas Sulci, for example). The origin of the aureole remains debated, but it was likely formed by huge landslides or gravity-driven thrust sheets that sloughed off the edges of the Olympus Mons shield.

=== Erebus Montes ===
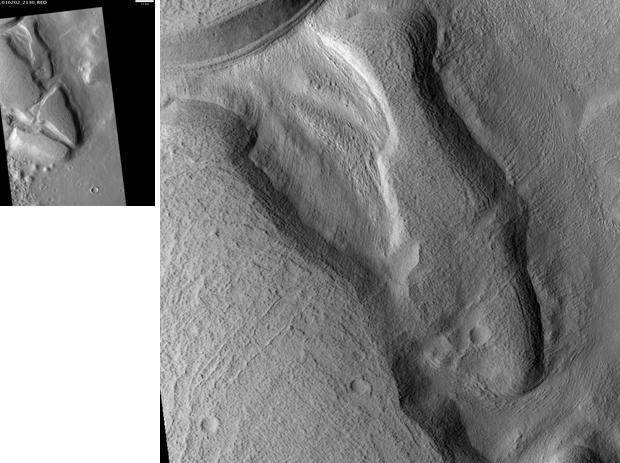
Erebus Montes, as seen by HiRISE. Grooves indicate movement.

Westward from Lycus Sulci, across the flat plains of Amazonis Planitia, lies an elongated region of knobby terrain called Erebus Montes (Erebus Mountains). The region contains hundreds of clustered to isolated hillocks that stand 500 to 1,000 m above the surrounding plains. The presence of numerous partly filled "ghost" craters in the area indicates that the hills represent the high-standing remnants of ancient highland crust that was inundated by lava flows and (possibly) alluvial sediments from Tharsis in the southeast and the Elysium volcanic province to the west.

=== Arcadia Planitia and Southern Vastitas Borealis ===
North and east of the Erebus Montes are low-lying plains that characterize a large part of the Diacria Quadrangle and of the Martian northern hemisphere in general. Medium resolution Mariner 9 and Viking spacecraft images from the 1970s show that large portions of Arcadia Planitia have an overall mottled (blotchy light and dark) appearance. At higher resolution, landforms commonly consist of lobate flow fronts; small channel segments; wrinkle ridges; pedestal craters; and low, isolated volcano-like hills with summit craters. MOLA images reveal numerous large, shallowly buried craters, suggesting that an old cratered surface lies under a layer of younger material.

At the resolution of the Mars Orbital Camera (MOC) on the Mars Global Surveyor spacecraft (around several m per pixel), much of the northern plains has a distinctly stippled, pitted texture that causes the ground to resemble the surface of a basketball or orange rind. This texture is likely caused by a mantle of ice and dust covering the landscape. The small hollows and pits formed as the ice evaporated (sublimed).

The geologic history and origin of the northern plains are complex and still poorly understood. Many of the landforms resemble periglacial features seen on Earth, such as moraines, ice-wedged polygons, and pingos. Arcadia Planitia and Vastitas Borealis likely consist of a hodgepodge of old lava flows, ice-related features, and reworked sediments of diverse origin. Some theorize that the northern plains were once covered by oceans or large lakes.

== See also ==
- Dark slope streak
- Dust Devil Tracks
- Expanded Craters
- Fossa (geology)
- HiRISE
- HiWish program
- Inverted relief
- List of quadrangles on Mars
- List of rocks on Mars
- Martian Gullies
- Milankovic (Martian crater)
- Outflow channels
- Valley networks (Mars)
- Phoenix lander
- Polygonal patterned ground
- Volcanism on Mars
- Water on Mars

MC-01 Mare Boreum (features)
MC-02 Diacria (features)		MC-03 Arcadia (features)	MC-04 Acidalium (features)	MC-05 Ismenius Lacus (features)		MC-06 Casius (features)	MC-07 Cebrenia (features)
MC-08 Amazonis (features)	MC-09 Tharsis (features)	MC-10 Lunae Palus (features)	MC-11 Oxia Palus (features)	MC-12 Arabia (features)	MC-13 Syrtis Major (features)	MC-14 Amenthes (features)	MC-15 Elysium (features)
MC-16 Memnonia (features)	MC-17 Phoenicis Lacus (features)	MC-18 Coprates (features)	MC-19 Margaritifer Sinus (features)	MC-20 Sinus Sabaeus (features)	MC-21 Iapygia (features)	MC-22 Mare Tyrrhenum (features)	MC-23 Aeolis (features)
MC-24 Phaethontis (features)		MC-25 Thaumasia (features)	MC-26 Argyre (features)	MC-27 Noachis (features)		MC-28 Hellas (features)	MC-29 Eridania (features)
MC-30 Mare Australe (features)
