= Gigas Sulci =

Sulci on Mars

Gigas Sulci as seen from THEMIS day-time infrared

Gigas Sulci is an area of subparallel furrows and ridges in the Tharsis quadrangle of Mars, located at 10°N 127.8°W. It is 398 km across and was named after a classical albedo feature name. The term "sulci" is applied to subparallel furrows and ridges.

Gigas Sulci, as seen by THEMIS. Wavy linear ridges are dunes. Dark slope streaks are visible on some slopes if you click on image for larger view.
