= Arcadia Planitia =

Plain on Mars

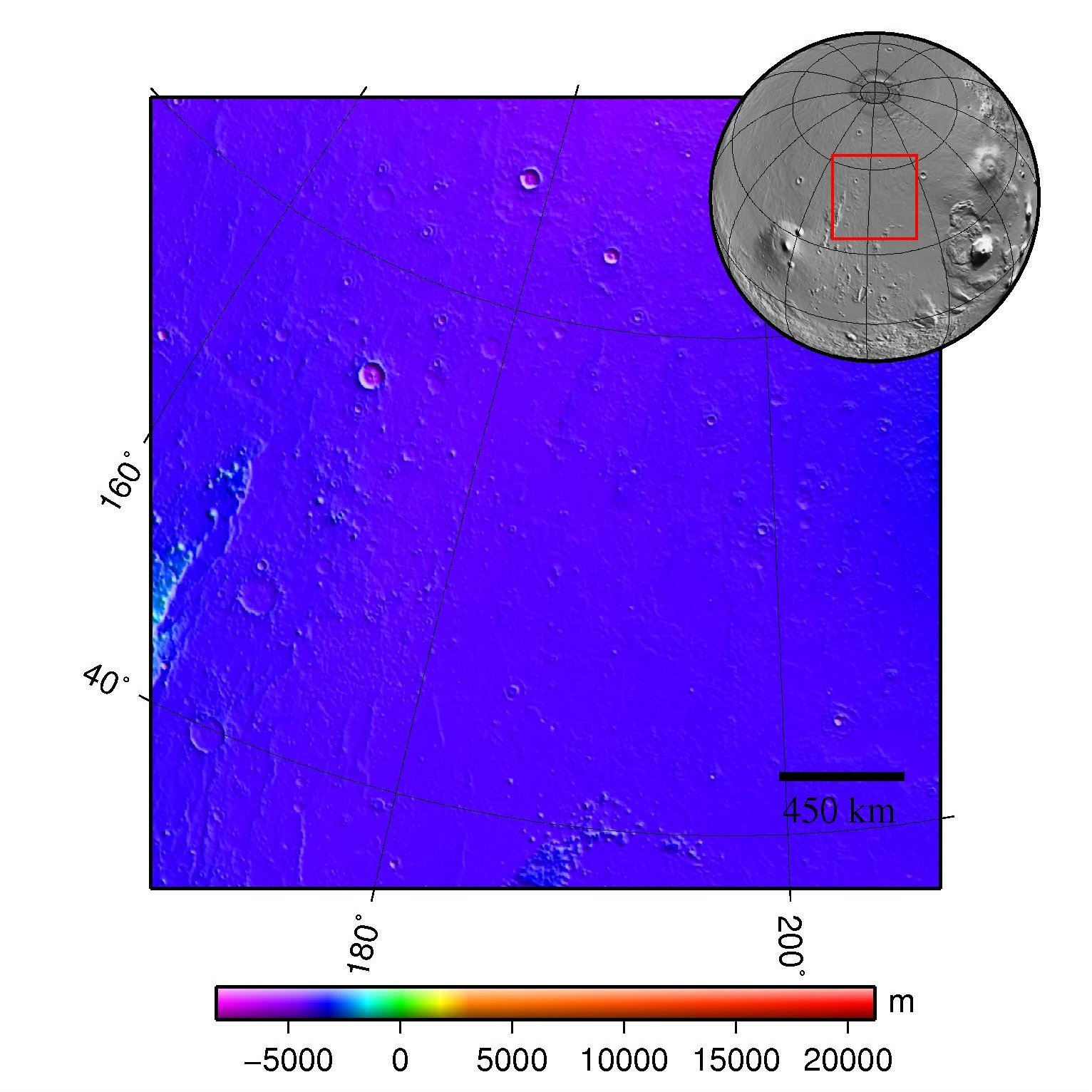
- Topographic map of Arcadia Planitia
- Feature type: Plains
- Coordinates: 47.2°N 184.3°E

Arcadia Planitia is a smooth plain with fresh lava flows and Amazonian volcanic flows on Mars. It was named by Giovanni Schiaparelli in 1882 after the Arcadia region of ancient Greece. It dates from the Amazonian period's arcadia formation's lava flows and small cinder cones. It includes a more recently developed large region of aeolian materials derived from periglacial processes.

It is located northwest of the Tharsis region in the northern lowlands, spanning roughly the region 33.9–64.2° North and 165.9–210.4° East, straddling partly in the Cebrenia quadrangle (MC-07), and partly in the Diacria one (MC-02), and centered at 47.2°N 184.3°E. Arcadia marks a transition from the thinly cratered terrain to its north and the very old cratered terrain to the south. On its east it runs into the Alba Mons volcanoes. Its elevation relative to the geodetic datum varies between 0 and -3 km.

Many low-lying areas of Arcadia are marked by grooves and sub-parallel ridges. These features indicate glaciation and appear similar to those on Earth, where the freezing and thawing of water located between ground layers contributes to the slow flow of near-surface materials. This supports the proposition that ground ice exists in the near-surface of Arcadia Planitia, and therefore this location is an area of interest for potential exploration missions.

== Expanded craters ==
Large impacts often create swarms of small secondary craters from the debris that is blasted out as a consequence of the impact. Studies of a type of secondary craters, called expanded craters, have given us insights into places where abundant ice may be present in the ground. Expanded craters have lost their rims, which may be because any rim that was once present has collapsed into the crater during expansion or lost its ice if composed of ice.

Excess ice (ice in addition to what is in the pores of the ground) is widespread throughout the Martian mid-latitudes, especially in Arcadia Planitia. In this region are many expanded secondary craters that probably form from impacts that destabilize a subsurface layer of excess ice, which subsequently sublimates. With sublimation, the ice changes directly from a solid to gaseous form. In the impact, the excess ice is broken up, resulting in an increase in surface area. Ice will sublimate much more if there is more surface area. After the ice disappears into the atmosphere, dry soil material will collapse and cause the crater diameter to become larger. Places on Mars that display expanded craters may indicate where future colonists can find water ice.

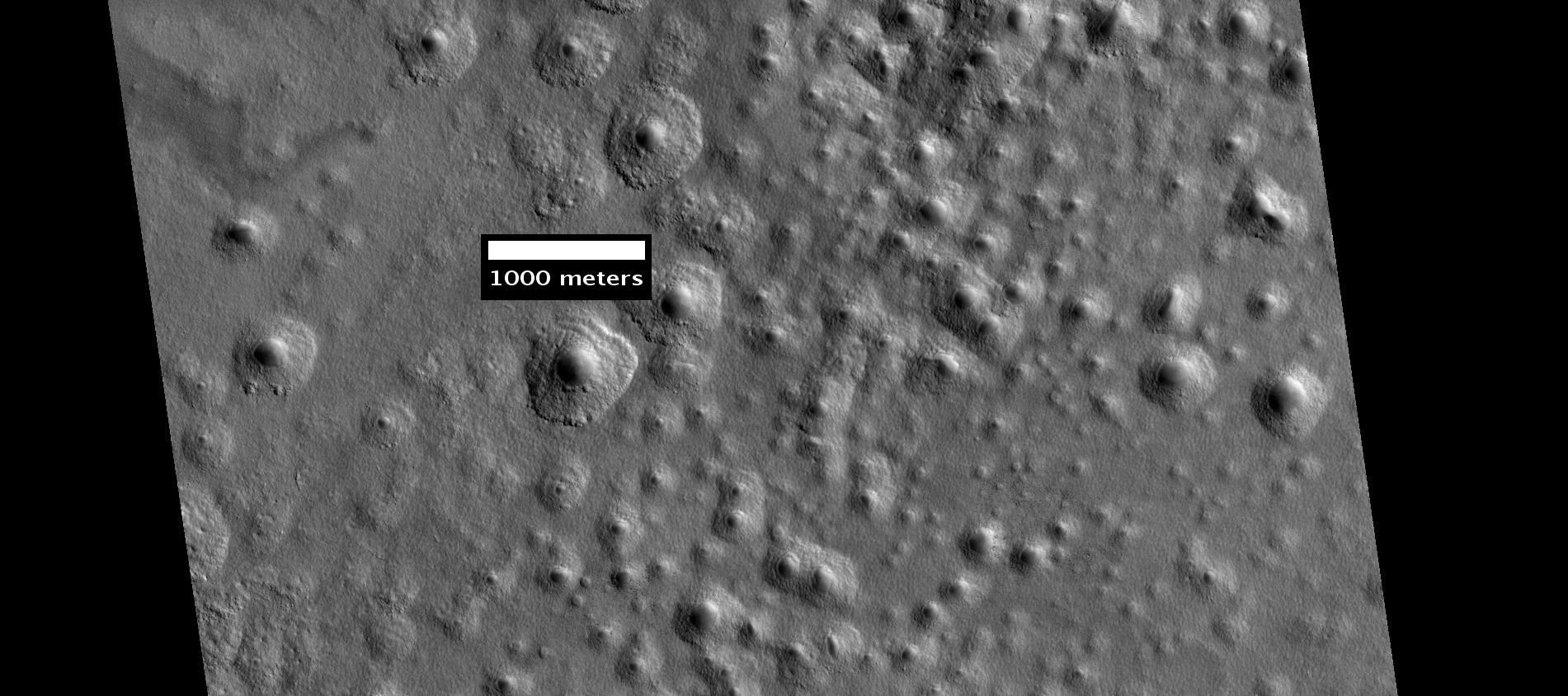
Close view of expanded craters, as seen by HiRISE. After the impact, ice left the ground and widened the crater's diameter.

== Gullies ==
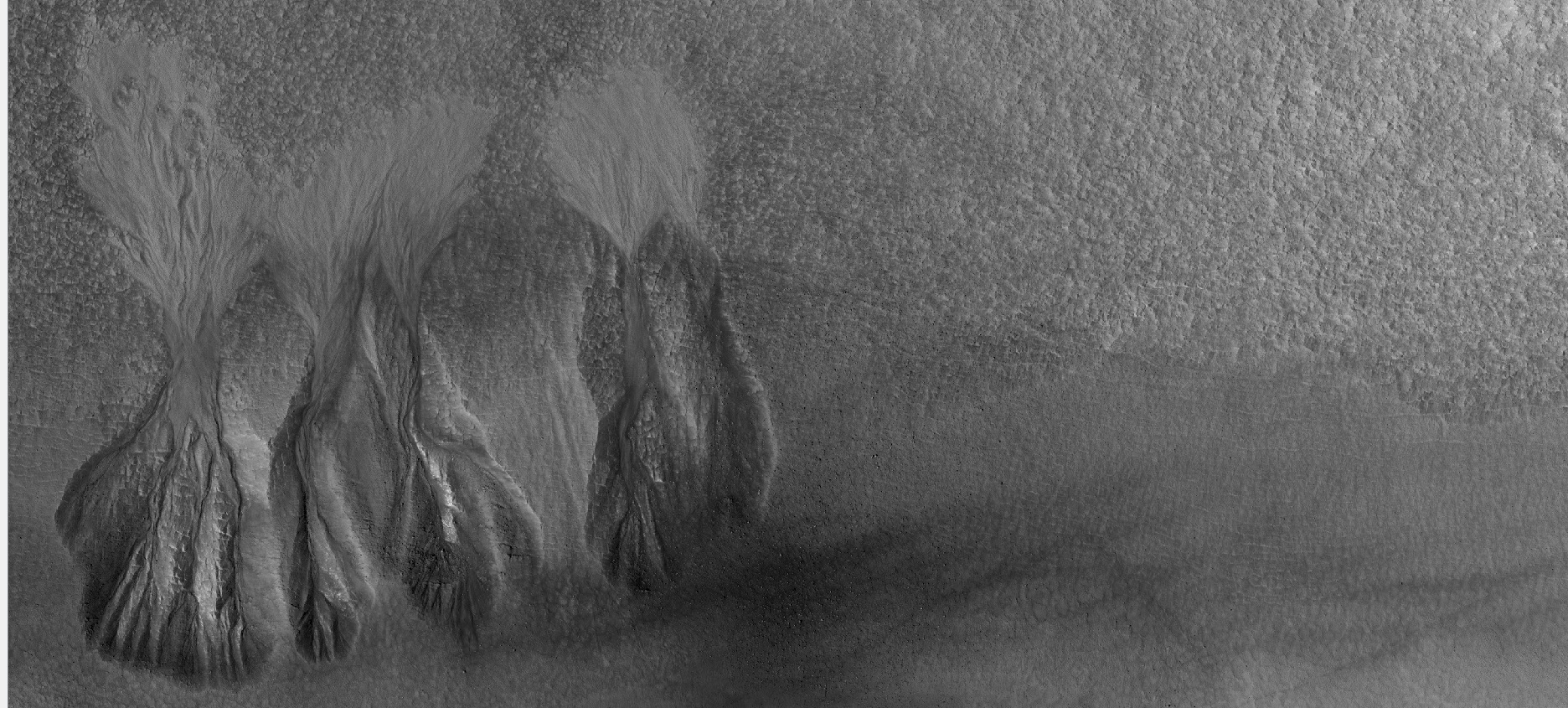
Wide view of group of gullies, as seen by HiRISE under HiWish program. Note that part of this image is enlarged in the following image.

Martian gullies are small, incised networks of narrow channels and their associated downslope sediment deposits, found on the planet of Mars. They are named for their resemblance to terrestrial gullies. First discovered on images from Mars Global Surveyor, they occur on steep slopes, especially on the walls of craters. Usually, each gully has a dendritic alcove at its head, a fan-shaped apron at its base, and a single thread of incised channel linking the two, giving the whole gully an hourglass shape. They are believed to be relatively young because they have few, if any craters. A subclass of gullies is also found cut into the faces of sand dunes which themselves considered to be quite young. On the basis of their form, aspects, positions, and location amongst and apparent interaction with features thought to be rich in water ice, many researchers believed that the processes carving the gullies involve liquid water. However, this remains a topic of active research. The pictures below show gullies in Arcadia Planitia.

== See also ==
- Climate of Mars
- Geography of Mars
- List of plains on Mars
- Martian Gullies
