= Cyane Fossae =

Fossae on Mars

- Cyane Fossae based on THEMIS day-time image
- Coordinates: 31.3°N 121.2°W

Cyane Fossae is a trough in the Diacria quadrangle of Mars. It is centered at 31.3° north latitude and 121.2° west longitude. It is 913 kilometres (567 mi) long and was named after a classical albedo feature name.

The term "fossae" is used to indicate large troughs when using geographical terminology related to Mars. Troughs, sometimes also called grabens, form when the crust is stretched until it breaks, which forms two breaks with a middle section moving down, leaving steep cliffs along the sides. Sometimes, a line of pits form as materials collapse into a void that forms from the stretching.
