= Diacria =

Highlands in greece north-east of Attica

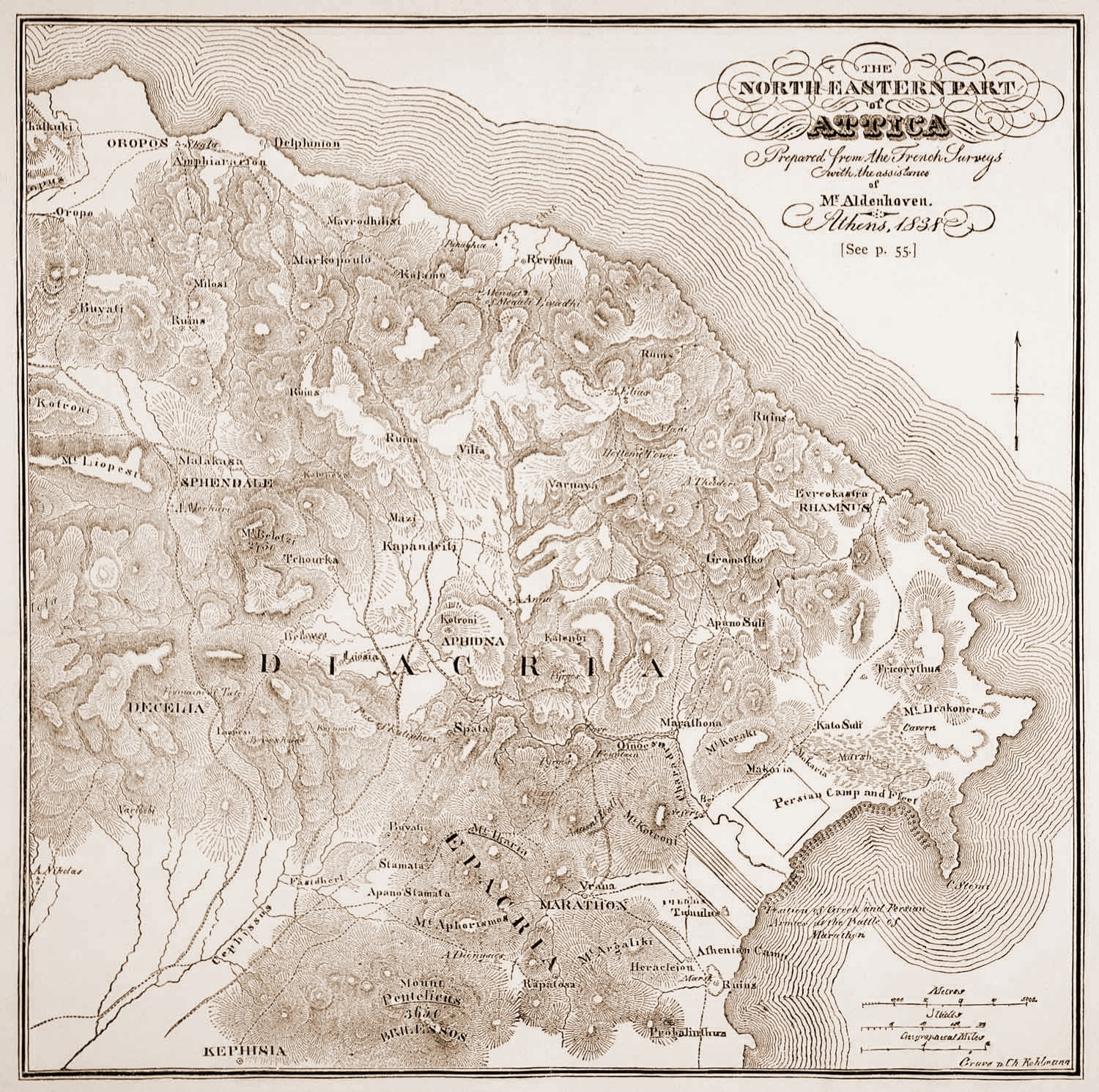
Diacria, showing the dispositions of the Greek and Persian forces at the Battle of Marathon

Diacria (Greek: Διακρία) is an ancient name for the highlands in the north-east of Attica in Greece, surrounding the Plain of Marathon.

Attica may be divided into five natural parts:

- The Eleusinian Plain
- The Athenian Plain
- The Paralia or Sea-coasts
- The Mesogaea or Midlands
- The Diacria or Highlands

North-east of the Athenian plain, between Parnes, Pentelicus, and the sea, is a mountain district, known by the name of Diacria (Διακρία) in antiquity. Its inhabitants, usually called Diacreis or Diacrii (Διακρεῖς, Diakreis or Διακρίοι, Diakrioi), were sometimes also termed Hyperacrii (Ὑπερακρίοι. Hyperakrioi), apparently from their dwelling on the other side of the mountain from the city. The only level part of this district is the small plain of Marathon, open to the sea.

When the astronomer E. M. Antoniadi created his 1930 encyclopedic study of Mars, La Planète Mars, he named a small greyish region in the planet's northern hemisphere after the classical Diacria. This was later adopted in the official name of the Diacria quadrangle, one of the cartographic quadrangles of the Martian atlas.
