= Erebus Montes =

Group of mountains on Mars

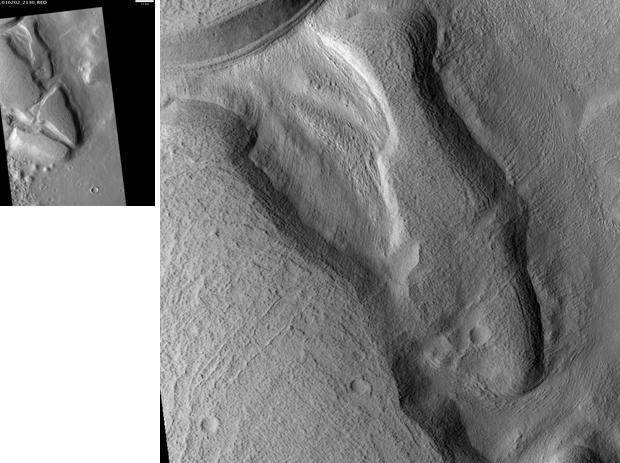
- Erebus Montes, as seen by HiRISE. Grooves indicate movement.
- Coordinates: 35.66°N 185.02°W

Erebus Montes is a group of mountains in the Diacria quadrangle of Mars, located at 35.66° North and 185.02° West. It is 811 km across and was named after an albedo feature at 26N, 182W.

Northern part of Erebus Montes based on THEMIS
