= Dark slope streak =

Surface feature of Mars

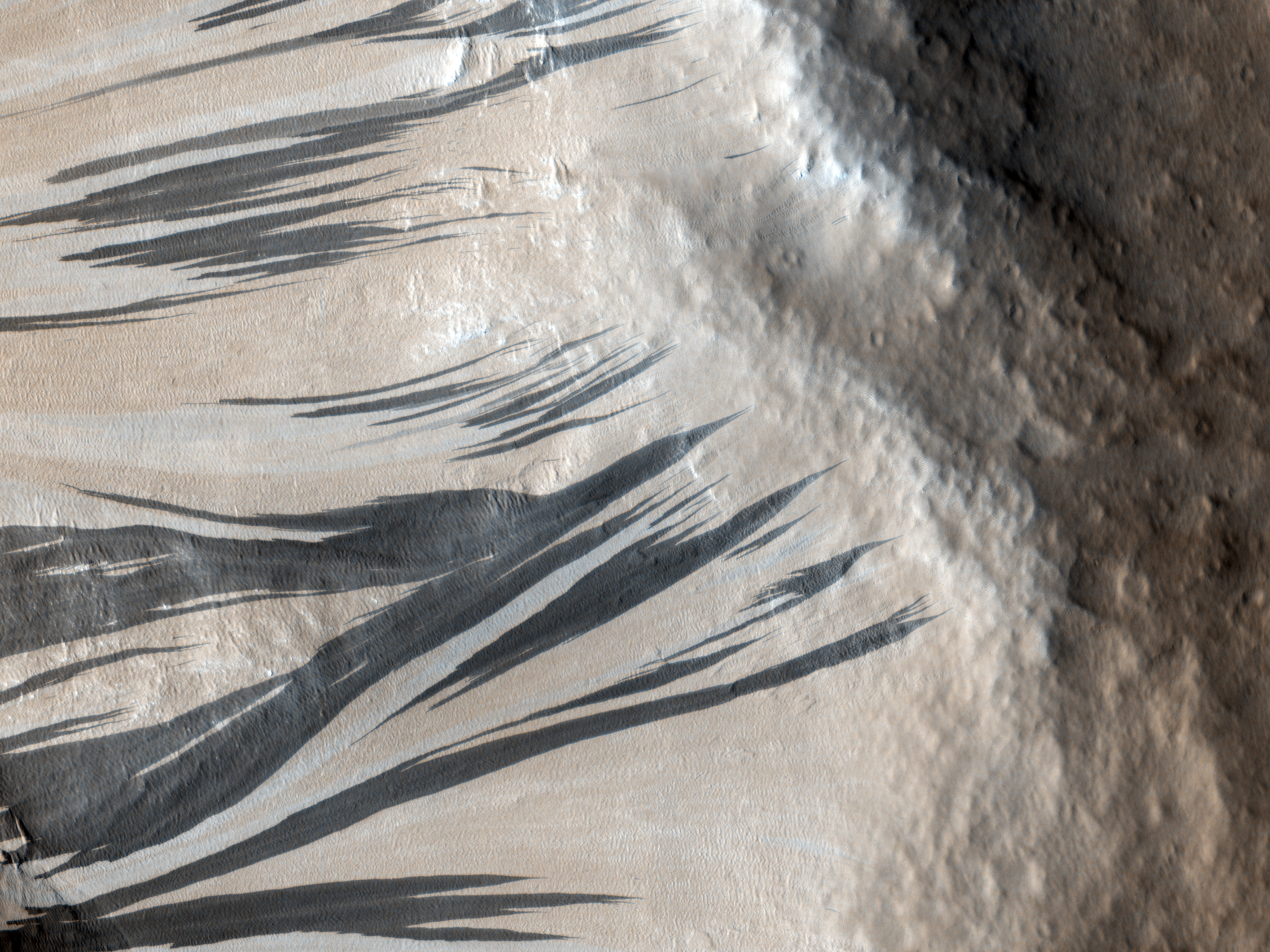
Slope streaks in Acheron Fossae in 2010

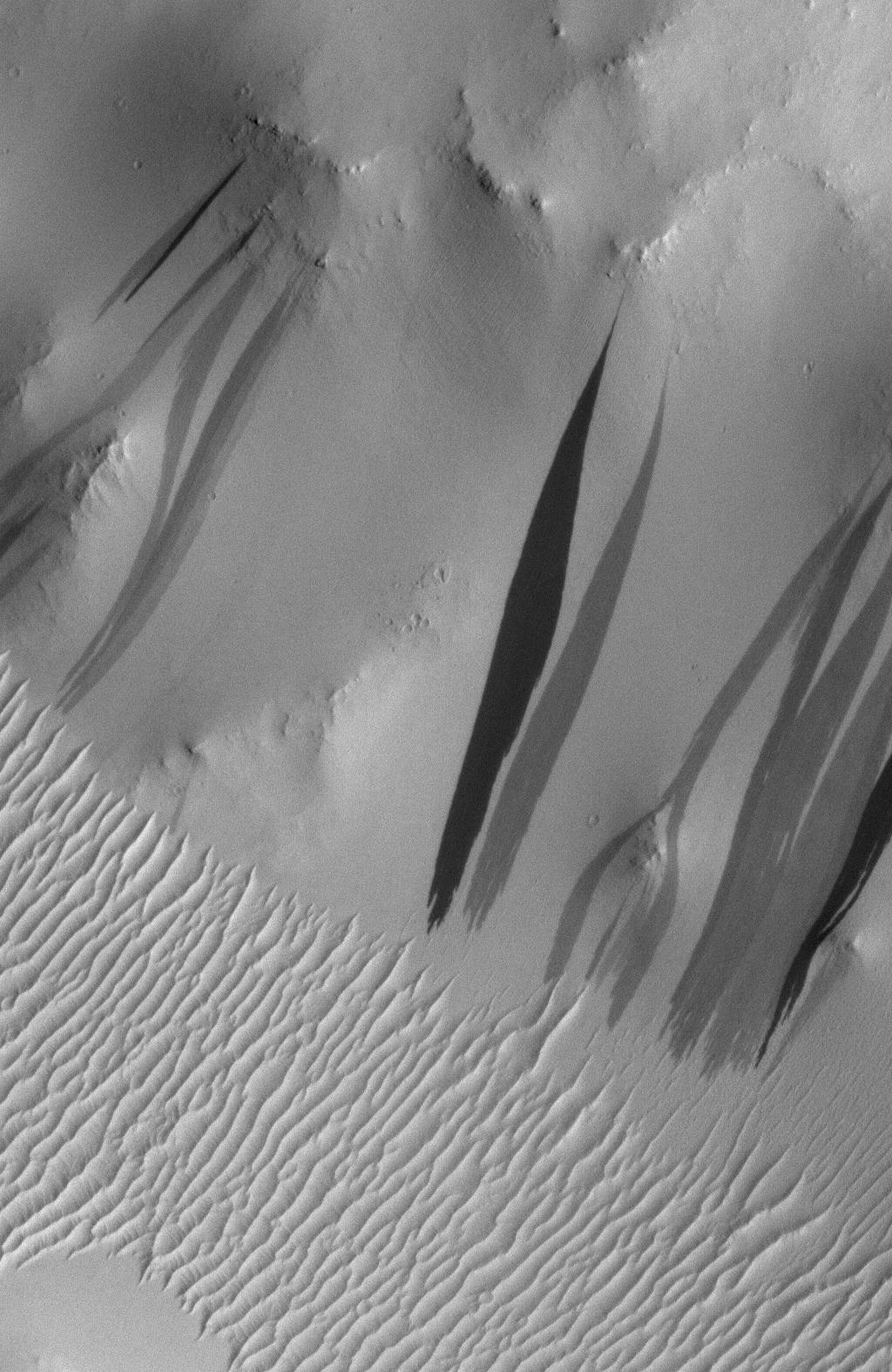
Dark slope streaks in Arabia Terra as seen by Mars Orbital Camera (MOC) on Mars Global Surveyor spacecraft. The darkest streaks are only about 10% darker than their surroundings. The greater apparent contrast in the image is due to contrast enhancement Image is 1.65 km (1 mi) across. North is at bottom.

Dark slope streaks are narrow, avalanche-like features common on dust-covered slopes in the equatorial regions of Mars. They form in relatively steep terrain, such as along escarpments and crater walls. Although first recognized in Viking Orbiter images from the late 1970s, dark slope streaks were not studied in detail until higher-resolution images from the Mars Global Surveyor (MGS) and Mars Reconnaissance Orbiter (MRO) spacecraft became available in the late 1990s and 2000s.

The physical process that produces dark slope streaks is still uncertain. They are most likely caused by the mass movement of loose, fine-grained material on oversteepened slopes (i.e., dust avalanches). The avalanching disturbs and removes a bright surface layer of dust to expose a darker substrate. In a study of over 500,000 dark slope streaks, researchers found that streaks were more likely to form in dusty areas instead of moist places. The authors also determined that slope streaks modify less than 0.1% of the martian surface, but transport several global storm equivalents of dust per Mars year; hence, potentially playing a major role in the martian dust cycle."

The role that water and other volatiles play, if any, in streak formation is still debated. Slope streaks are particularly intriguing because they are one of the few geological phenomena that can be observed occurring on Mars in the present day.

== Nature of streaks on Mars ==
Dark slope streaks are albedo features. They appear to the eye as a brightness difference between the streak and the lighter-toned background slope. Usually no topographic relief is visible to distinguish the streak from its surroundings, except in the very highest resolution (<1 m/pixel) images. In many cases, the original surface texture of the slope is preserved and continuous across the streak, as though unaffected by events involved in dark streak formation (pictured left). The overall effect is equivalent in appearance to a partial shadow cast down the sloping surface. These observations indicate that whatever process forms the streaks, it affects only the very thinnest layer at the surface. Slope streaks are only about 10% darker than their surroundings but often appear black in images because the contrast has been enhanced (stretched).

Albedo features cover the Martian surface at a wide variety of scales. They make up the classical light and dark marking seen on Mars through telescopes. (See Classical albedo features on Mars.) The markings are caused by differing proportions of dust covering the surface. Martian dust is bright reddish ochre in color, while the bedrock and soil (regolith) is dark gray (the color of unaltered basalt). Thus, dusty areas on Mars appear bright (high albedo), and surfaces with a high percentage of rocks and rock fragments are generally dark (low albedo). Most albedo features on Mars are caused by winds, which clear some areas of dust, leaving behind a darker lag. In other areas, dust is deposited to produce a bright surface. The selective removal and deposition of dust is most conspicuous around impact craters and other obstacles where a variety of streaks (wind tails) and blotches are formed.

Dark slope streaks are relatively small features. (See A in Photo Gallery.) They differ from larger albedo features in being produced by gravity rather than wind, although wind may contribute to their initial formation. (See B in Photo Gallery.) The cause of the darkening is uncertain. The particle sizes involved are believed to be very small (sand, silt, and clay-sized particles). No clasts large enough to be imaged are present, and the underlying bedrock slope is never exposed ( i.e., dust is avalanching on a surface of dust). Apparently, other optical, mechanical, or chemical properties are involved in producing the darker tone.

Dark slope streaks commonly share the same slope with other slope streaks of varying tones. The darkest streaks are presumed to be youngest; they have margins that are more sharply defined than streaks that are not as dark. This relationship suggests that streaks lighten and become more diffuse with age, probably because they become covered with fresh dust falling from the atmosphere. Faded dark slope streaks should not be confused with bright slope streaks (discussed below). Dust storms are common on Mars. At times the whole planet is enveloped in a dust storm, as shown in the picture below.

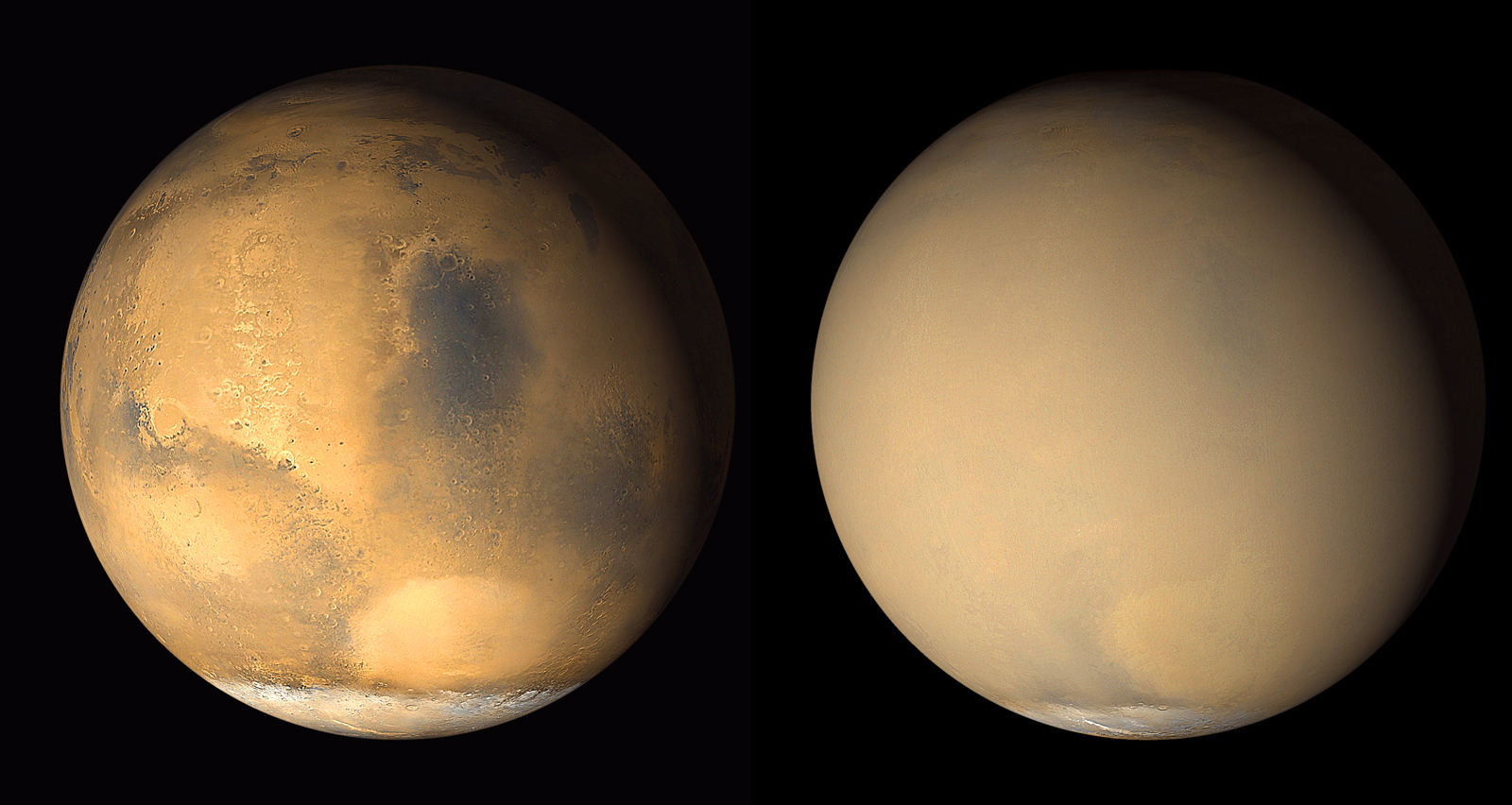
Mars without a dust storm in June 2001 (on left) and with a global dust storm in July 2001 (on right), as seen by Mars Global Surveyor

== Morphology and occurrence ==
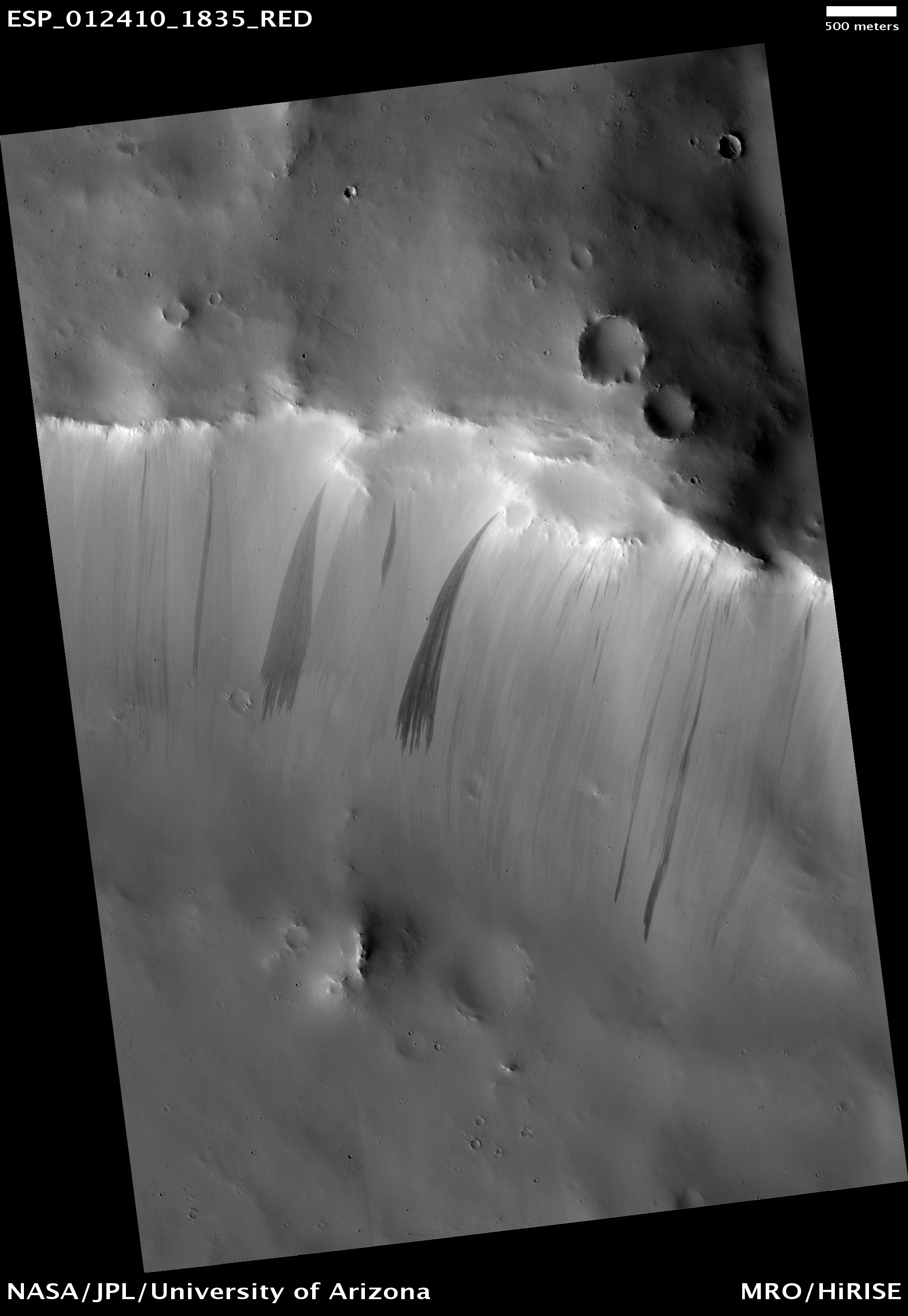
Dark slope streaks are often fan-shaped with multiple fingers (digitation) at their downslope ends. Image is from the HiRISE camera on the Mars Reconnaissance Orbiter.

At moderate resolutions (20–50 m/pixel), dark slope streaks appear as thin, parallel filaments aligned downslope along crater rims and escarpments. They are often straight but may also be curved or sigmoid in shape. (See C in Photo Gallery.) Closer up, dark slope streaks typically have elongated, fan-like shapes (pictured right). They range from about 20 to 200 meters in width and are generally several hundred meters to over 1,000 meters long. Dark slope streaks exceeding 2 kilometers in length are uncommon; most terminate on slope and do not extend further out on to level terrain.

A streak commonly starts at a single point (apex) high on the slope. The apex is often associated with an isolated small ridge, knob, or other area of local steepening. In high-resolution images, a tiny impact crater is sometimes visible at the apex. Slope streaks widen downslope from the apex in a triangular fashion, usually reaching their maximum widths short of the halfway point of their lengths. A single slope streak can split into two separate streaks around an obstacle or form an anastamosing (braided) pattern. (See D and E in Photo Gallery.) Slope streaks commonly develop multiple fingers (digitation) at their downslope ends.

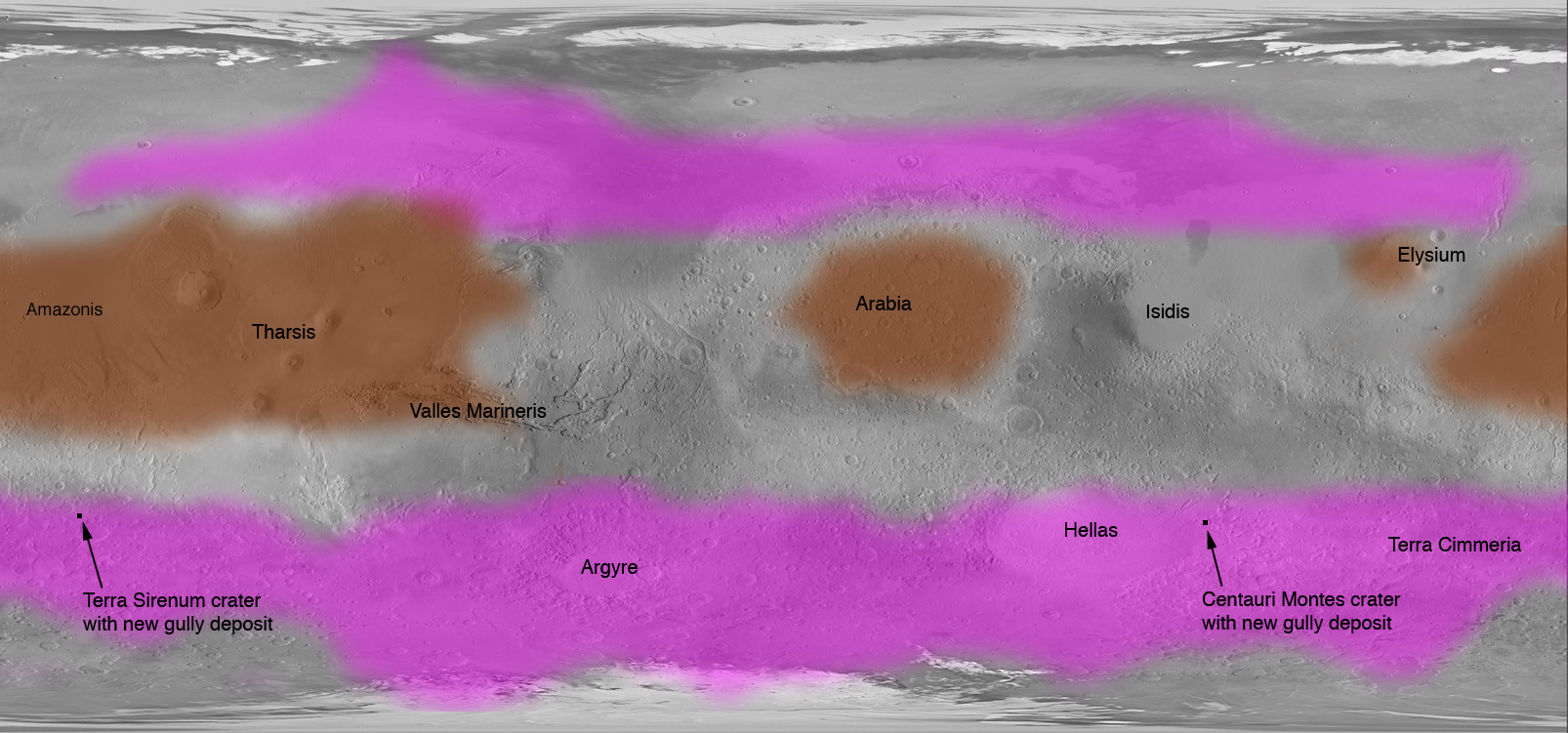
Map of Mars showing that dark slope streaks (brown) occur in dust-covered, equatorial regions. Pink areas are the locations of Martian Gullies and gully deposits. The geographical distribution indicates that gullies and slope streaks are different phenomena.

Images from the High Resolution Imaging Science Experiment (HiRISE) on MRO have shown that many slope streaks have relief, contrary to earlier descriptions in which no topographic distinction could be seen between the streaked and adjacent, non-streaked surface. The streaked surface is typically about 1 m lower than the non-streaked surface. This relief is only visible in maximum resolution images under optimal viewing conditions.

Dark slope streaks are most common in the equatorial regions of Mars, particularly in Tharsis, Arabia Terra, and Amazonis Planitia (pictured left). They occur between latitudes 39°N and 28°S. At their northern limits, they appear preferentially on warmer, south facing slopes. Curiously, slope streaks are also associated with areas that reach peak temperatures of 275K (2 °C), a temperature close to the triple point of water on Mars. This relationship has led some researchers to suggest that liquid water is involved in dark slope streak formation.

Dark slope streaks do not appear to correlate with elevation or areas of specific bedrock geology. They occur on a wide range of slope textures, including surfaces that are smooth, featureless, and presumably young, as well as older, heavily cratered slopes. However, they are always associated with areas of high surface roughness, high albedo, and low thermal inertia, properties that indicate steep slopes covered with a lot of dust.

It has been suggested that streaks could form when accumulations of dry ice start subliming right after sunrise. Nighttime CO_{2} frost is widespread in low latitudes.

== Formation mechanism ==
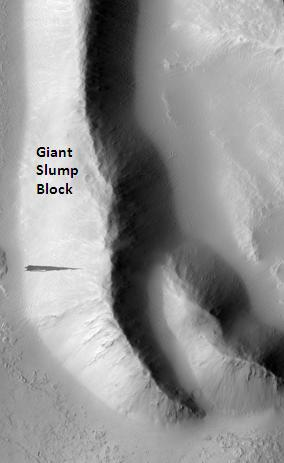
Annotated image of Tharsis Tholus dark streak, as seen by Hirise. It is located in the middle left of this picture. Tharsis Tholus is just off to the right.

Researchers have proposed a number of mechanisms for dark slope streak formation. The most widely held view is that the streaks are the result of dust avalanches produced by dry granular flow on oversteepened slopes. Dust avalanches resemble loose snow avalanches on Earth. Loose snow avalanches occur when snow accumulates under cold, nearly windless conditions, producing a dry, powdery snow with little cohesion between individual snow crystals. The process produces a very shallow trough (slough) on the surface of the snow, which from a distance appears slightly darker in tone than the rest of the slope.

Other models involve water, either in the form of spring discharges, wet debris flows, or seasonal percolation of chloride-rich brines. Using data from the Mars Odyssey neutron spectrometer, researchers found that slope streaks in the Schiaparelli basin occur in areas predicted to yield between 7.0 and 9.0 weight percent Water Equivalent Hydrogen (WEH) in contrast to typical background values of less than 4% WEH. This relationship suggests a connection between high WEH percentages and the occurrence of dark slope streaks. However, any process that requires voluminous amounts of water (e.g., spring discharges) seems unlikely because of the overall thermodynamic instability of liquid water on Mars.

Another model proposes that dark slope streaks are produced by ground-hugging density currents of dry dust lubricated by carbon dioxide (CO_{2}) gas. In this scenario, a small initial slump at the surface releases CO_{2} gas adsorbed onto subsurface grains. This release produces a gas-supported dust flow that moves as a tenuous density current downslope. This mechanism may help explain slope streaks that are unusually long.

Some observations suggest that dark slope streaks can be triggered by impacts. Pictures acquired by CTX in 2007 and 2010 showed a new streak appeared in the aureole of Olympus Mons. A follow-up image from HiRISE showed that a new crater at the top of the streak. The researchers concluded that the impact triggered the new slope streak. Another streak connected with an impact was found in the Arabia quadrangle.

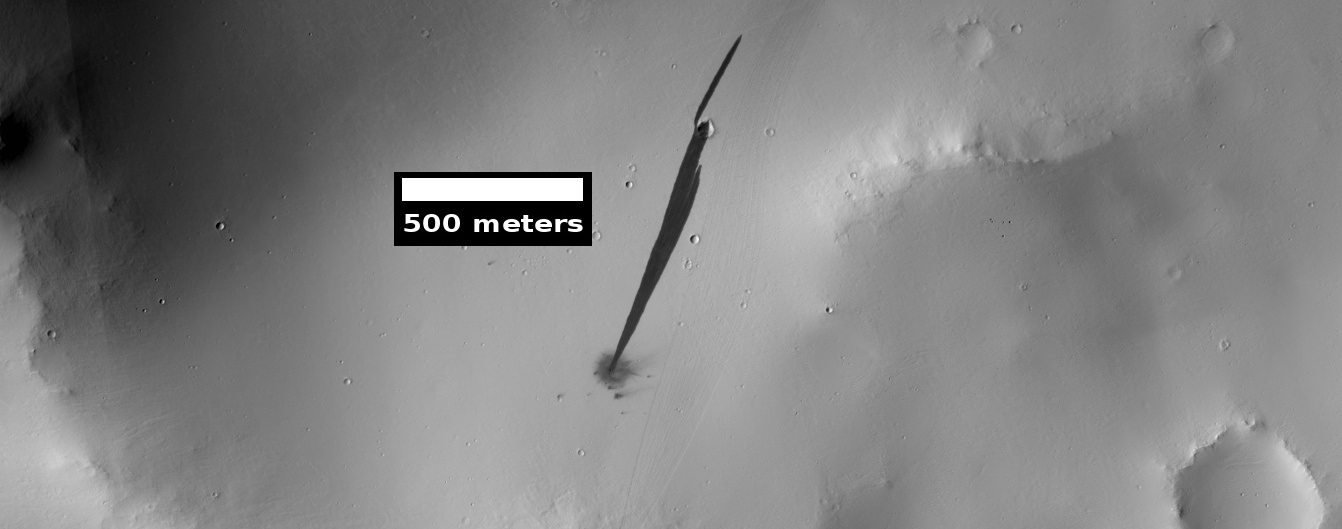
New streak that was caused by a recent impact that created a small crater, as seen by HiRISE. Location is the Arabia quadrangle.

Research, published in January 2012 in Icarus, found that dark streaks were initiated by airblasts from meteorites traveling at supersonic speeds. The team of scientists was led by Kaylan Burleigh, an undergraduate at the University of Arizona. After counting some 65,000 dark streaks around the impact site of a group of five new craters, patterns emerged. The number of streaks was greatest closer to the impact site. So, the impact somehow probably caused the streaks. Also, the distribution of the streaks formed a pattern with two wings extending from the impact site. The curved wings resembled scimitars, curved knives. This pattern suggests that an interaction of airblasts from the group of meteorites shook dust loose enough to start dust avalanches that formed the many dark streaks. At first it was thought that the shaking of the ground from the impact caused the dust avalanches, but if that was the case the dark streaks would have been arranged symmetrically around the impacts, rather than being concentrated into curved shapes.

The crater cluster lies near the equator 510 miles) south of Olympus Mons, on a type of terrain called the Medusae Fossae formation. The formation is coated with dust and contains wind-carved ridges called yardangs. These yardangs have steep slopes thickly covered with dust, so when the sonic boom of the airblast arrived from the impacts dust started to move down the slope. Using photos from Mars Global Surveyor and HiRISE camera on NASA's Mars Reconnaissance Orbiter, scientists have found about 20 new impacts each year on Mars. Because the spacecraft have been imaging Mars almost continuously for a span of 14 years, newer images with suspected recent craters can be compared to older images to determine when the craters were formed. Since the craters were spotted in a HiRISE image from February 2006, but were not present in a Mars Global Surveyor image taken in May 2004, the impact occurred in that time frame.

The largest crater in the cluster is about 22 meters (72 feet) in diameter with close to the area of a basketball court. As the meteorite traveled through the Martian atmosphere it probably broke up; hence a tight group of impact craters resulted. Dark slope streaks have been seen for some time, and many ideas have been advanced to explain them. This research may have finally solved this mystery.

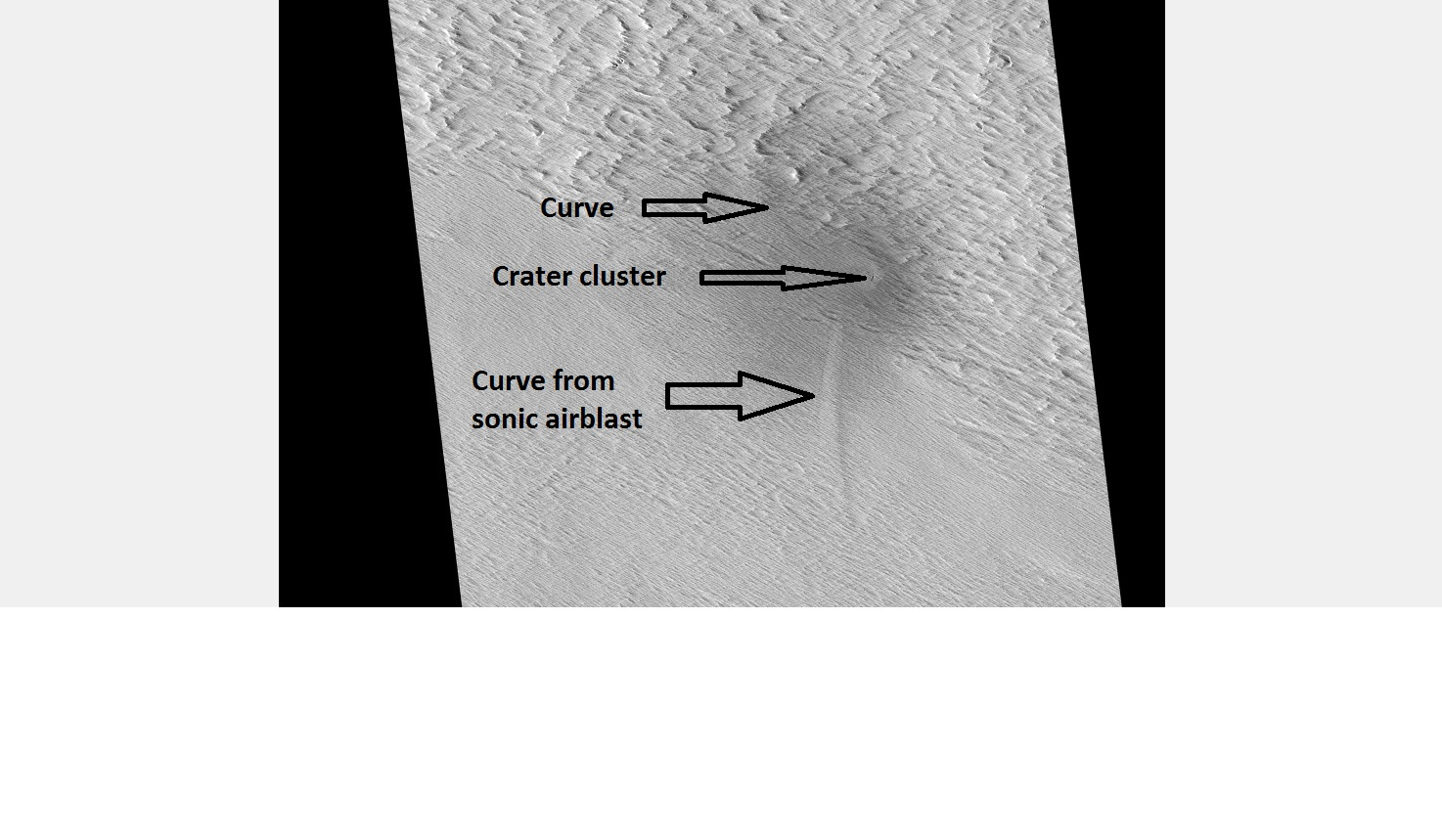
Image indicates crater cluster and curved lines formed by airblast from meteorites. Meteorites caused airblast which caused dust avalanches on steep slopes. Image is from HiRISE.

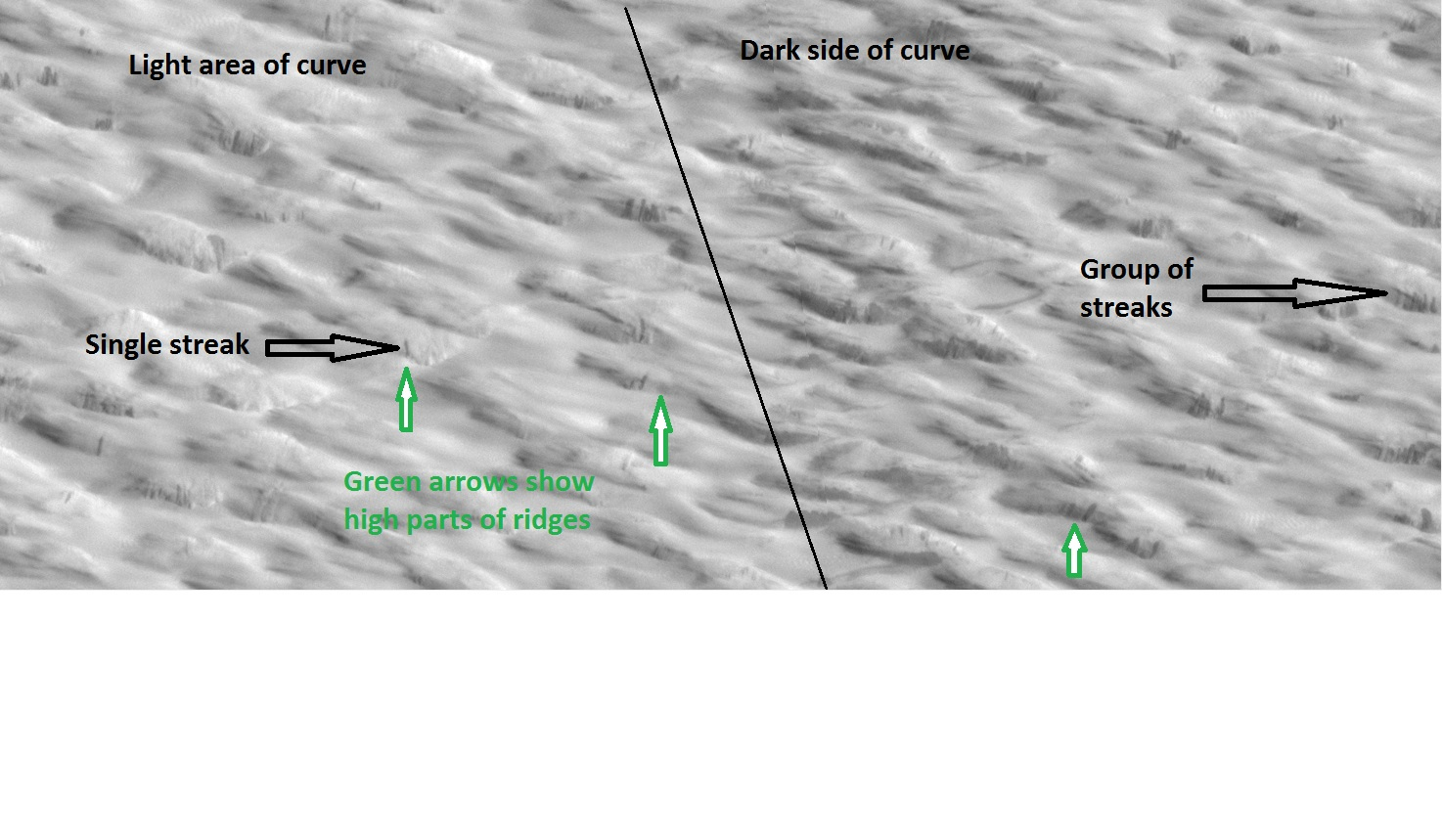
Close up of previous image along light/dark boundary. Dark line in middle of image shows border between light and dark area of curved lines. Green arrows show high areas of ridges. Loose dust moved down steep slopes when it felt the airblast from meteorite strikes. Image is from HiRISE.

Dust devils have even been observed to start the formation of dark slope streaks.

A team of researchers found an increase in dark slope streaks after S1222, a marsquake that was detected by the Insight lander.

== Formation rate ==
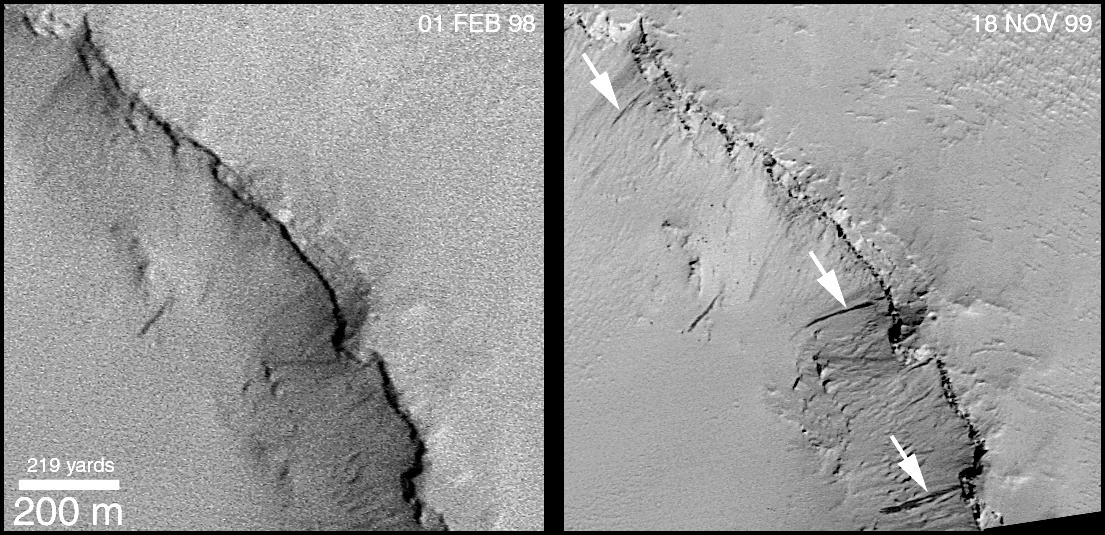
New slope streaks formed near Apollinaris Mons between February 1998 and November 1999, as seen by Mars Orbital Camera (MOC).

Slope streaks are one of the few geomorphic features forming on the surface of present-day Mars. New streaks were first identified by comparing images from the Viking Orbiters of the 1970s to images of the same locations taken by the MGS Mars Orbiter Camera (MOC) in the late 1990s. The presence of new streaks showed that slope streaks are actively forming on Mars, on at least annual to decade-long timescales. A later, statistical treatment using overlapping MOC images spaced days to several years apart showed that slope streaks may form on Mars at a rate of about 70 per day. If accurate, this rate suggests that slope streaks are the most dynamic geologic features observed on the surface of Mars.

Dark slope streaks fade and disappear at a much slower rate than new ones appear. Most streaks identified in Viking images are still visible after decades, although a few have vanished. Researchers infer that streaks appear at a rate 10 times faster than they disappear, and that the number of slope streaks on Mars has increased in the last three decades. This imbalance is unlikely to have persisted for geologically significant periods of time. One possible solution to the imbalance is that streaks last for centuries, but are wiped clean en masse after extremely rare but fierce dust storms (storms of a magnitude not observed on Mars since Viking). After the storm subsides, a thick layer of fresh dust is deposited to begin a new cycle of streak formation. A recent study published in Icarus found that they last about 40 years. The researchers looked at a region in Lycus Sulci with Viking images and with CTX images from the Mars Reconnaissance Orbiter. The ones first observed with Viking have all gone, but have been replaced with new ones.

== Similar and related features ==
Dark slope streaks occur in association with or superficially resemble a number of other small-scale, slope-related features on Mars. These include bright slope streaks, avalanche scars, and recurring slope lineae. Water tracks are features that occur in the polar regions of Earth. They resemble dark slope streaks and recurring slope lineae, but have not yet been described on Mars. Many of the slope features on Mars may originate through a continuum of processes with dry mass wasting and minor fluvial (water-related) activity occupying opposite endpoints. Gullies are another feature common on slopes in the mid-latitude southern hemisphere of Mars They have received much attention in the literature but are not discussed here.

=== Bright slope streaks ===
Bright slope streaks are streaks that have a lighter tone (about 2%) than their surroundings. (See F in Photo Gallery.) They are much rarer than dark slope streaks, but both types of streaks have similar morphologies and occur in the same regions of Mars. Evidence suggests that bright slope streaks are older than dark slope streaks. New bright slope streaks have never been observed, and dark slope streaks can be seen overlying bright slope streaks in some images, indicating that the former are younger than the latter. It is likely that bright slope streaks form from old dark slope streaks that have transitioned past a partially faded stage. This supposition is supported by geographical evidence indicating that bright slope streaks are slightly more common in regions where the formation rate of new dark slope streaks is low. In other words, areas with relatively many bright streaks tend to be less active and contain a higher population of old dark streaks.

=== Avalanche scars ===
Areas with abundant slope streaks also contain an apparently distinct class of avalanche scars. The scars resemble slope streaks in morphology and size. (See G in Photo Gallery) They are typically several meters deep and hundreds of meters long. They begin at a single point (sometimes a small, barely resolved impact crater) high on a slope. The edges radiate downslope in a triangular fashion. In about half of the documented examples, a low-lying mound of debris is visible at the downslope end. Originally called "meters-thick avalanche scars," these features were thought to be distinct from slope streaks. However, higher-resolution images from the HiRISE instrument on MRO suggest that meters-thick avalanche scars and slope streaks are related and part of a continuum of active mass wasting features formed by dust avalanches.

=== Recurring slope lineae (warm-season flows) ===
In the summer of 2011, a paper appeared in Science describing a new class of slope features with characteristics that suggest formation by seasonal releases of liquid water. (See H and I in Photo Gallery.) Called "recurring slope lineae" (RSL), the features received a considerable amount of media attention. RSLs are narrow (0.5 to 5 meters) dark markings that preferentially occur on steep, equator-facing slopes in the southern hemisphere between latitudes 48°S to 32°S. Repeat HiRISE images show that the markings appear and grow incrementally during warm seasons and fade in cold seasons. RSLs bear only a superficial resemblance to dark slope streaks. They are much smaller in width and have a different pattern of geographic occurrence and slope properties than dark slope streaks. RSLs seem to occur on bedrock slopes with seasonally high surface temperatures of 250–300K (-23–27 °C). These location may favor the flow of briney fluids emerging from seeps at certain times of the Martian year. Unlike RSLs, dark slope streaks appear to occur sporadically throughout the Martian year, and their triggering seems unrelated to season or large regional events.

=== Water tracks ===
Water tracks are little-studied slope features common in permafrost-dominated terrains in the arctic and Antarctic regions of Earth. They are zones of enhanced soil moisture that route water downslope over the top of the permanently frozen ground just below the surface (ice table). Although water tracks have not been specifically identified on Mars, several researchers have noted their morphological and spectroscopic similarity to Martian slope streaks. Like dark slope streaks, water tracks are narrow, sublinear features elongated in the downslope direction. They typically display a slight darkness relative to their surroundings and show little or no detectable relief. During peak flow conditions, they appear as damp, darkened, patches of soil that are generally less than 60 m wide and several hundred meters long. The dark surface discoloration vanishes in frozen water tracks during winter, rendering them nearly undetectable.

== Photo gallery ==
Dark streaks and related features appear in the images below. To see the features described in the caption and text, it may be necessary to enlarge the image by clicking on it.

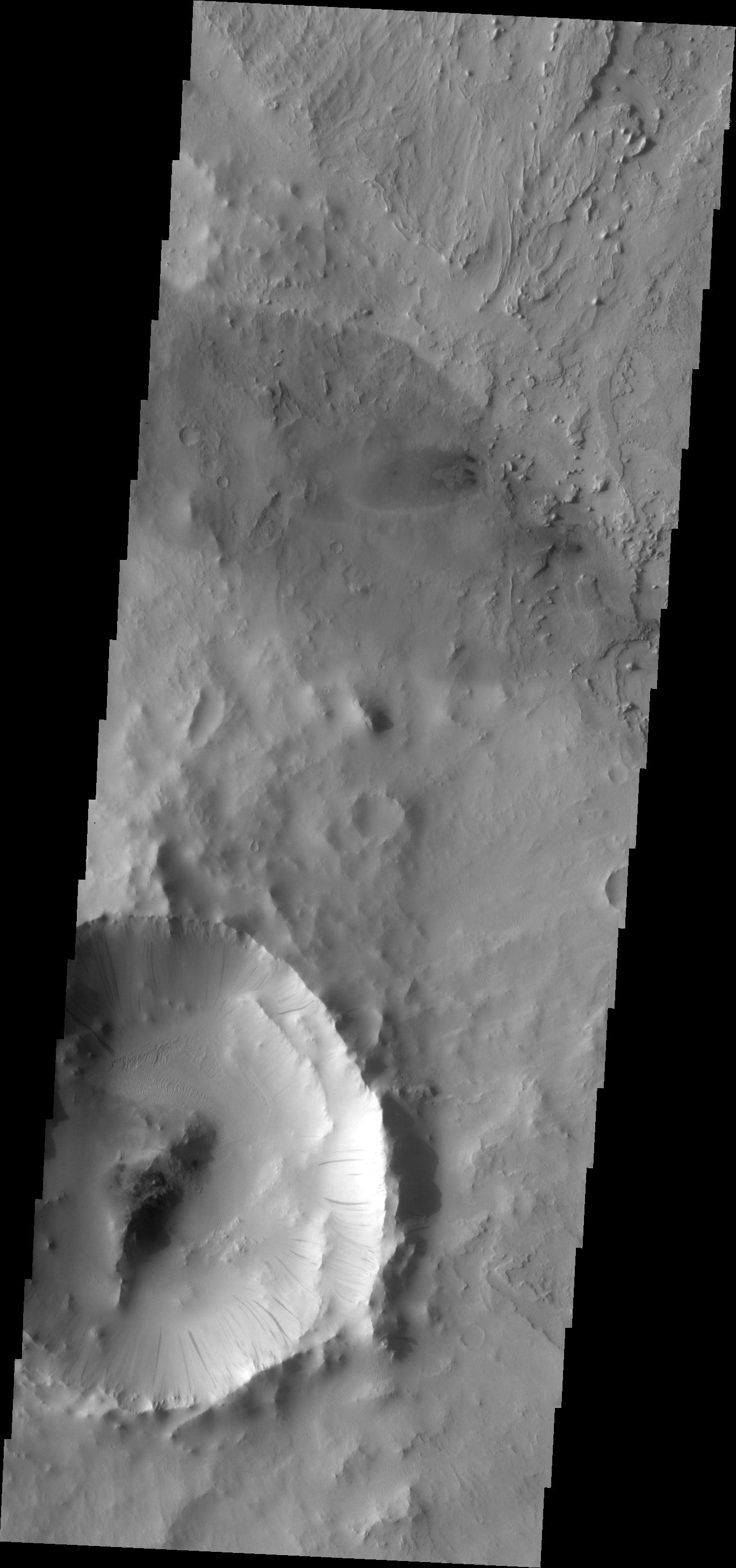
A. Dark slope streaks are the tiny, linear albedo features along the SE wall of the crater. Compare with the far larger, wind-related albedo feature (oval patch at center top of image). This image is a THEMIS VIS from the Mars Odyssey spacecraft. It is about 25 km wide. North is at top.

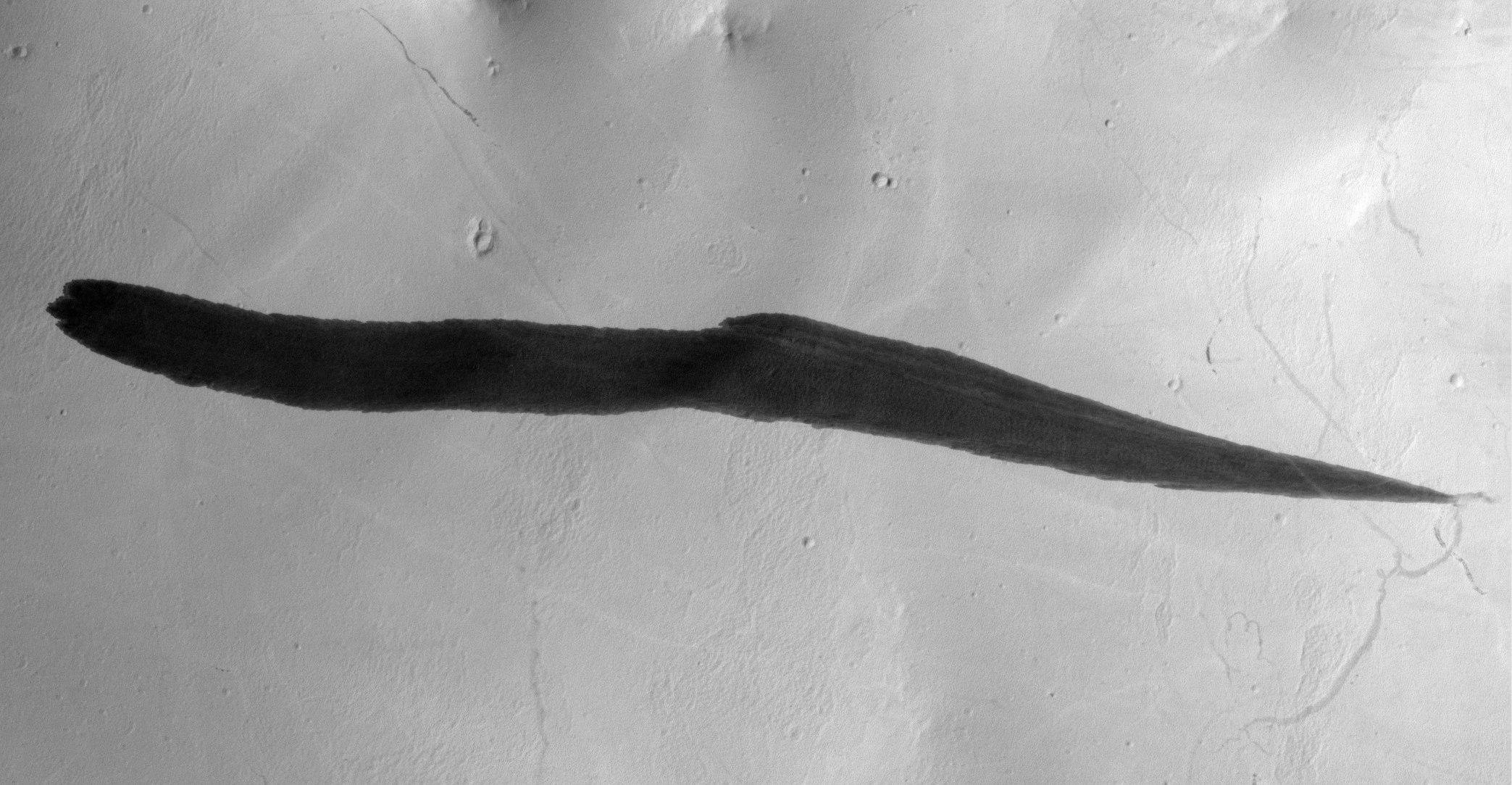
B. This dark slope streak may have been initiated by winds from dust devil. A thin dust devil track is visible across the apex of the slope streak. This Mars Reconnaissance Orbiter (MRO) HiRISE image is 1.8 km across and based on Schorghofer et al., 2007, p. 136, Fig. 5.

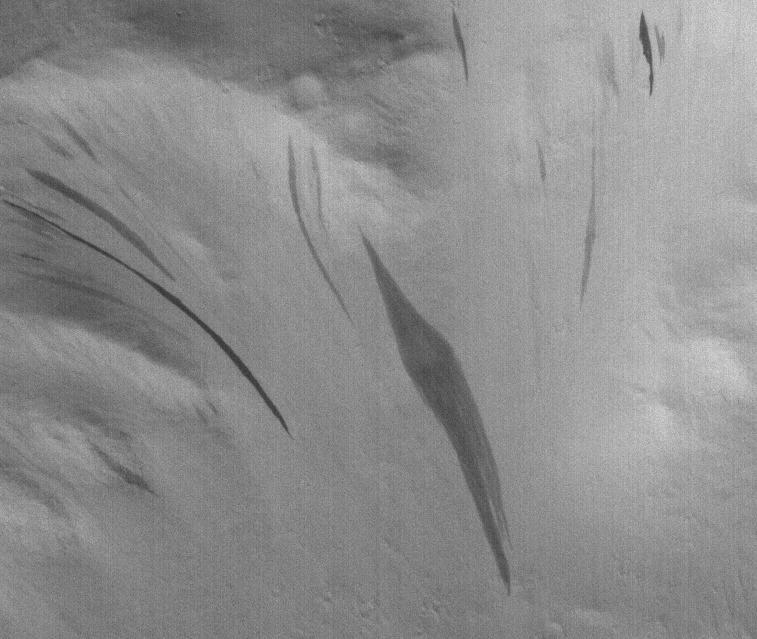
C. Dark streaks in Diacria quadrangle, as seen by the Mars Orbiter Camera (MOC) on Mars Global Surveyor (MGS).

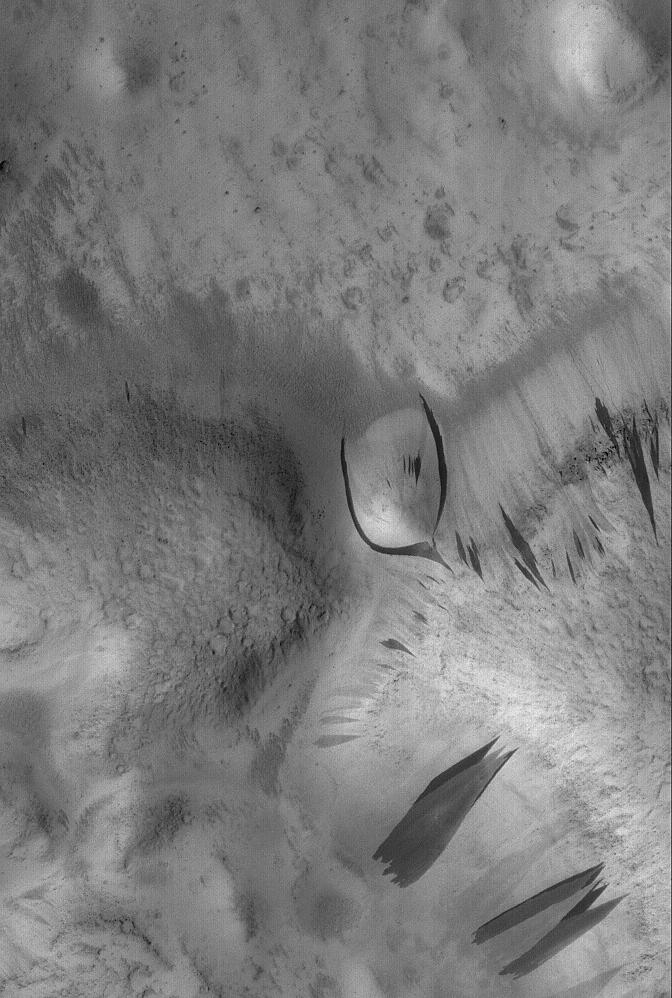
D. Dark slope streaks in Phlegra Dorsa region as seen by MOC. The streak near the center of image has been diverted around a small hill. The image is about 3 km (1.9 mi) across.

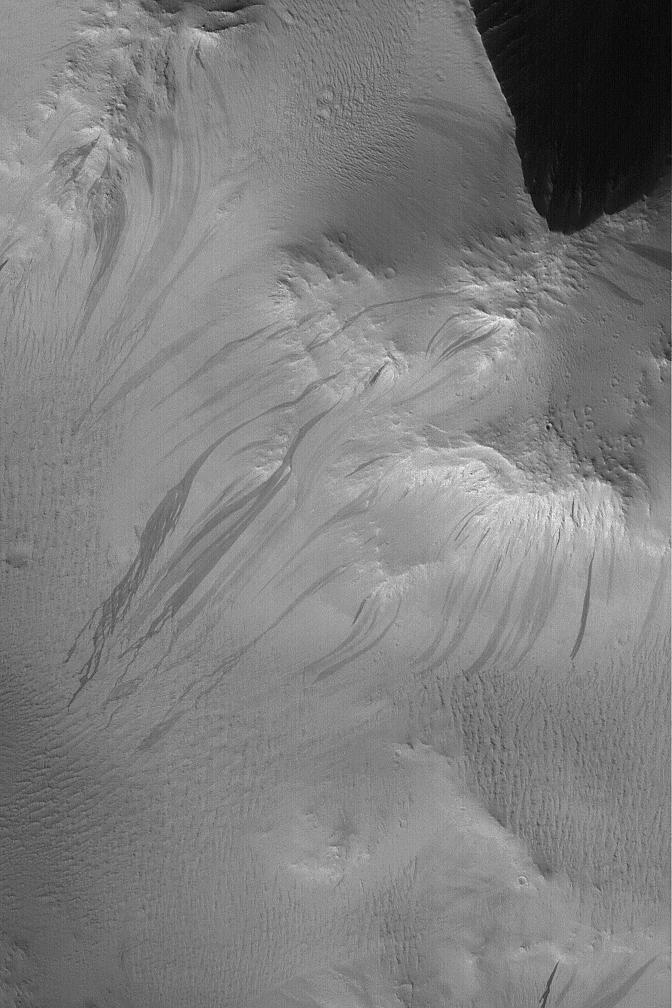
E. Braided (anastomosing) slope streak in Lycus Sulci region as seen by MOC. The morphology resembles features produced by fuidized flow. The image is about 3 km (1.9 mi) across.

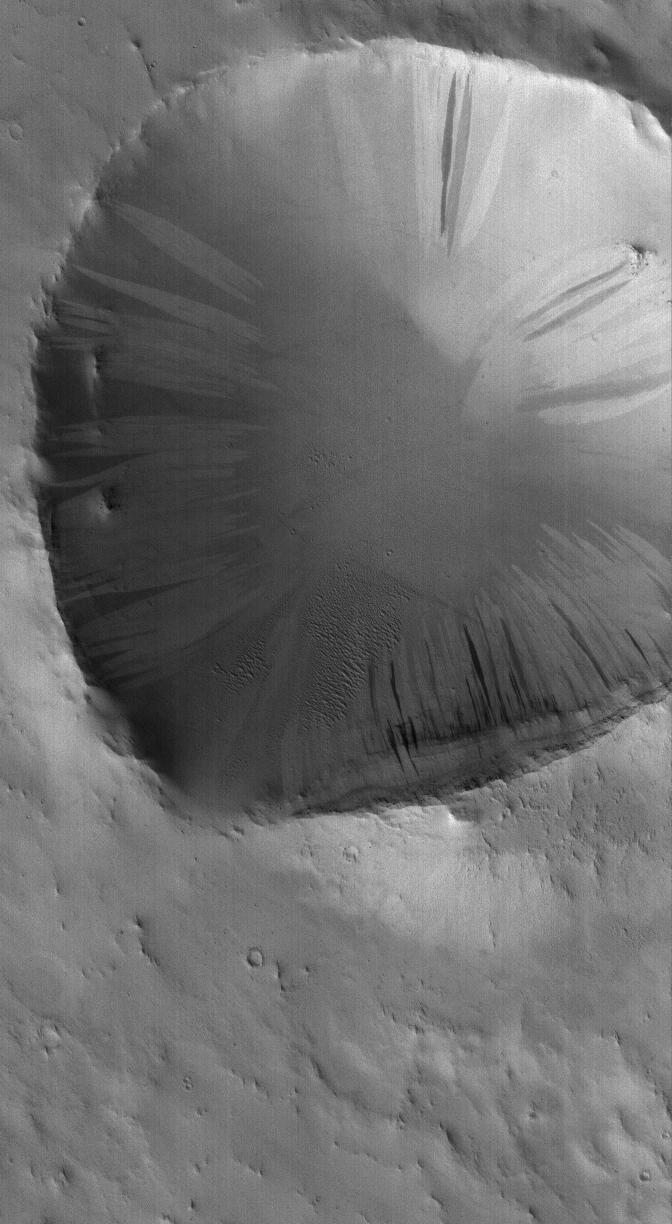
F. Both dark and bright slope sreaks occur together on the wall of this impact crater in Arabia Terra as seen by MOC. Photometric analysis shows that the brightness of the streaks is inherent and not due to lighting conditions or viewing geometry.

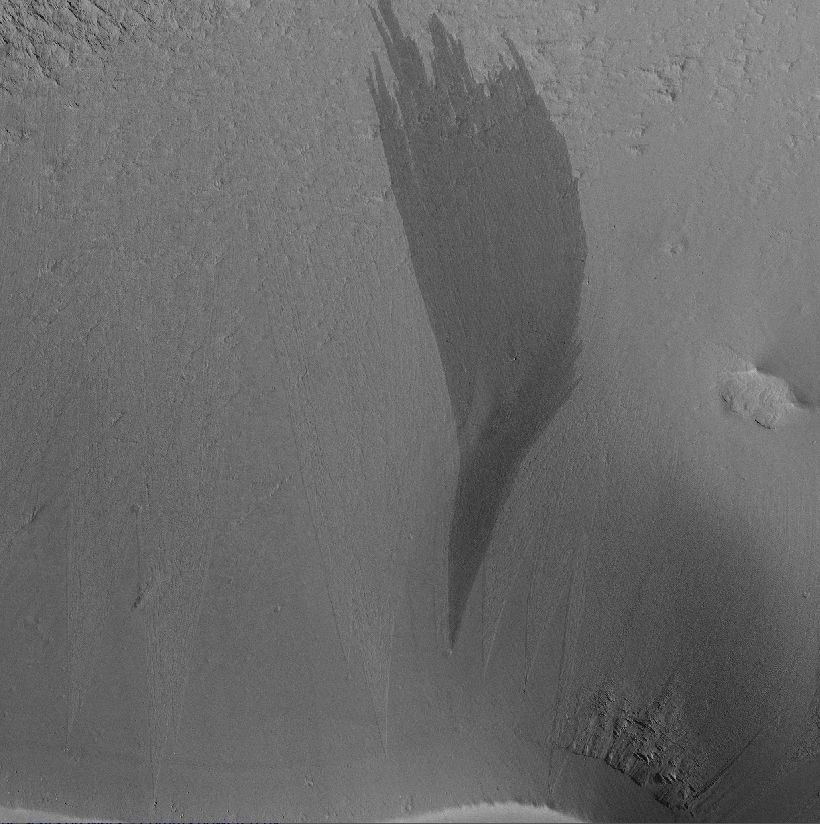
G. Shallow avalanche scars associated with dark slope streak. The slope streak has the same sharp apex and triangular-faceted morphology as the scars, suggesting that both types of features have a similar origin. Image is from HiRISE.

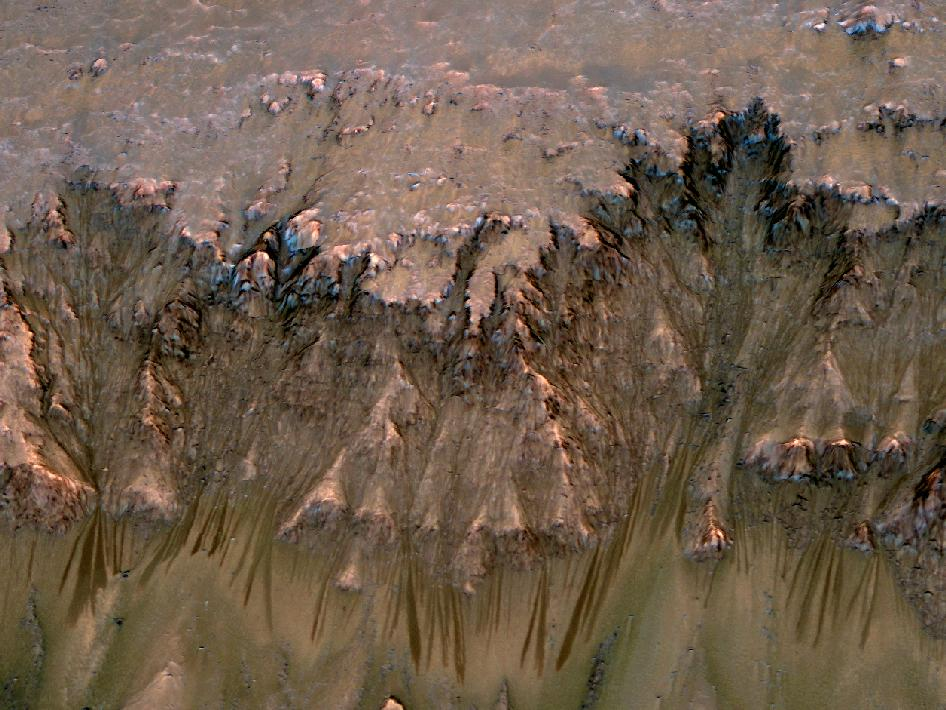
H. Recurring slope lineae as seen by HiRISE.

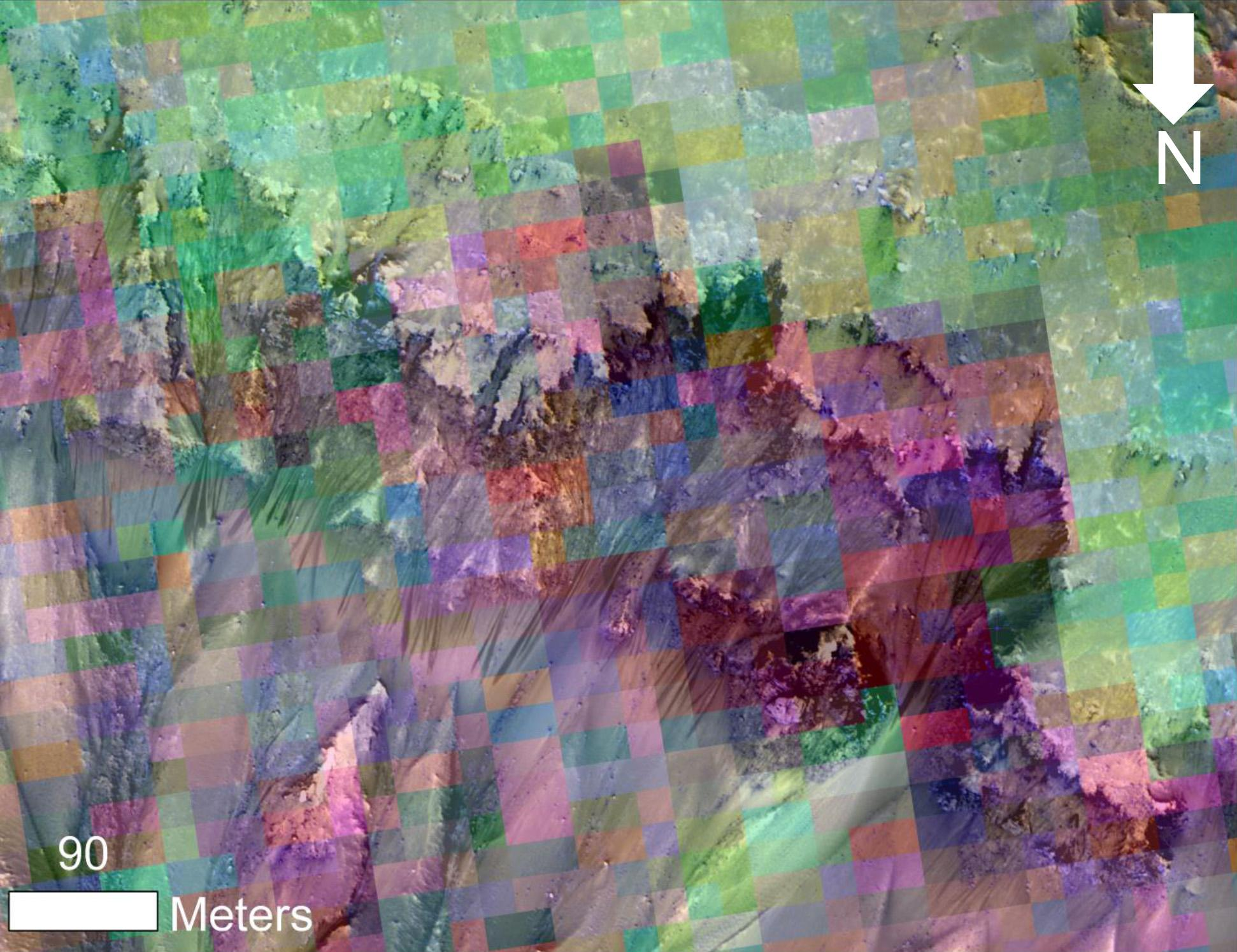
I. Seasonal Dark Flows, "Recurring Slope Linae" (RSL), on Martian slopes (2 November 2007).

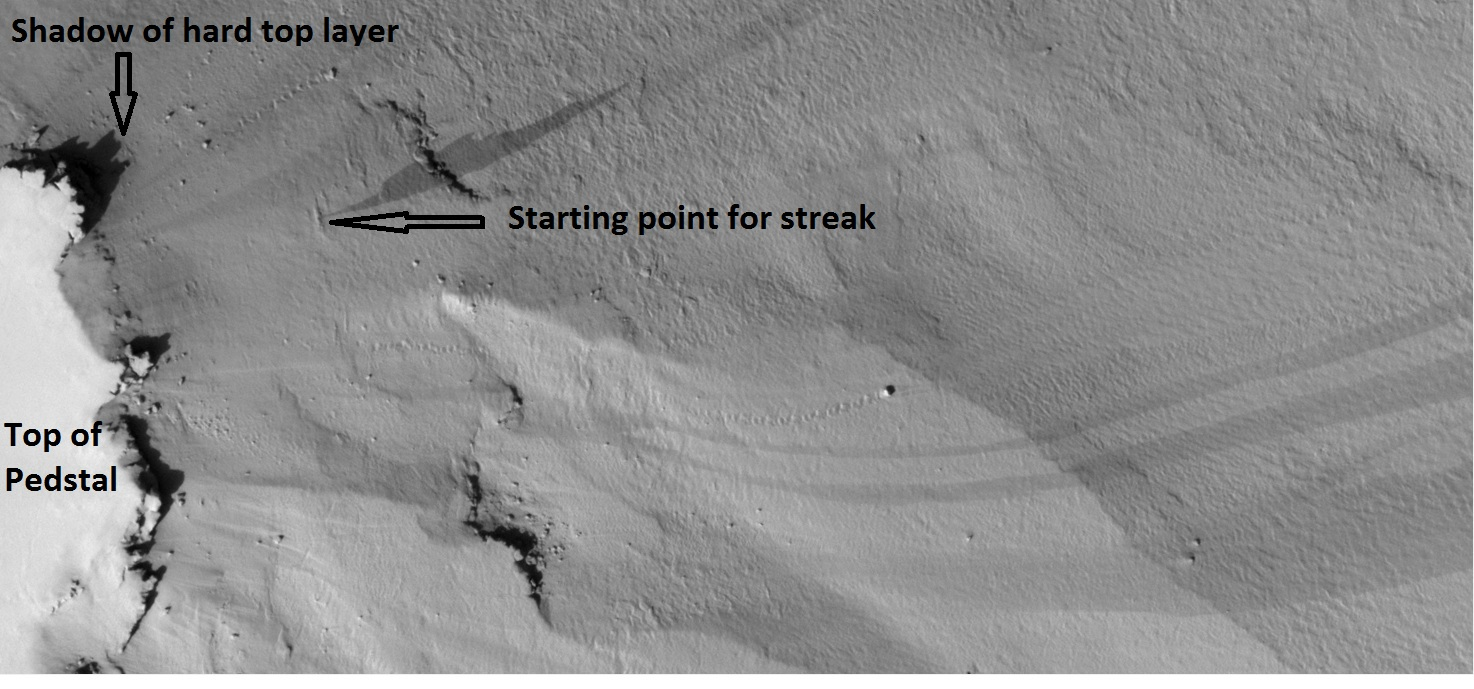
Dark slope streaks near the top of a pedestal crater, as seen by HiRISE under the HiWish program.

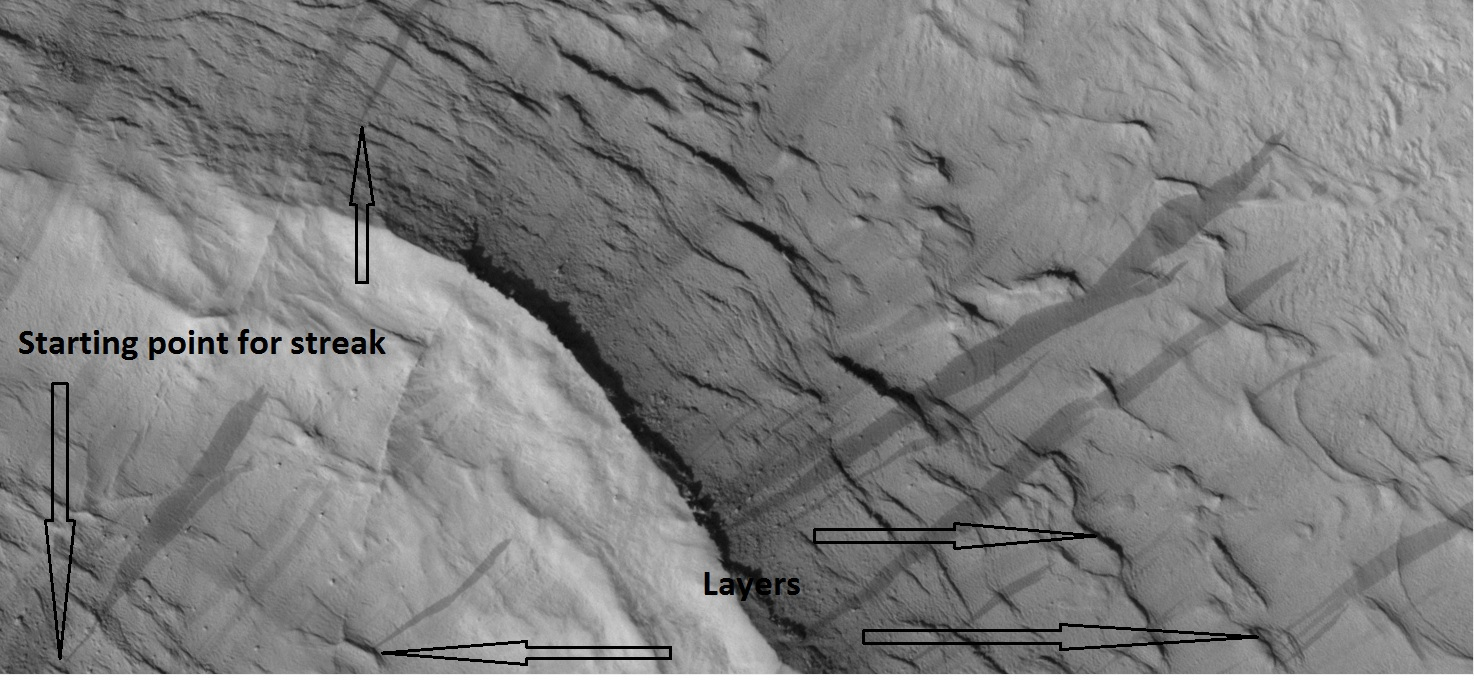
Dark slope streaks and layers near a pedestal crater, as seen by HiRISE under the HiWish program.

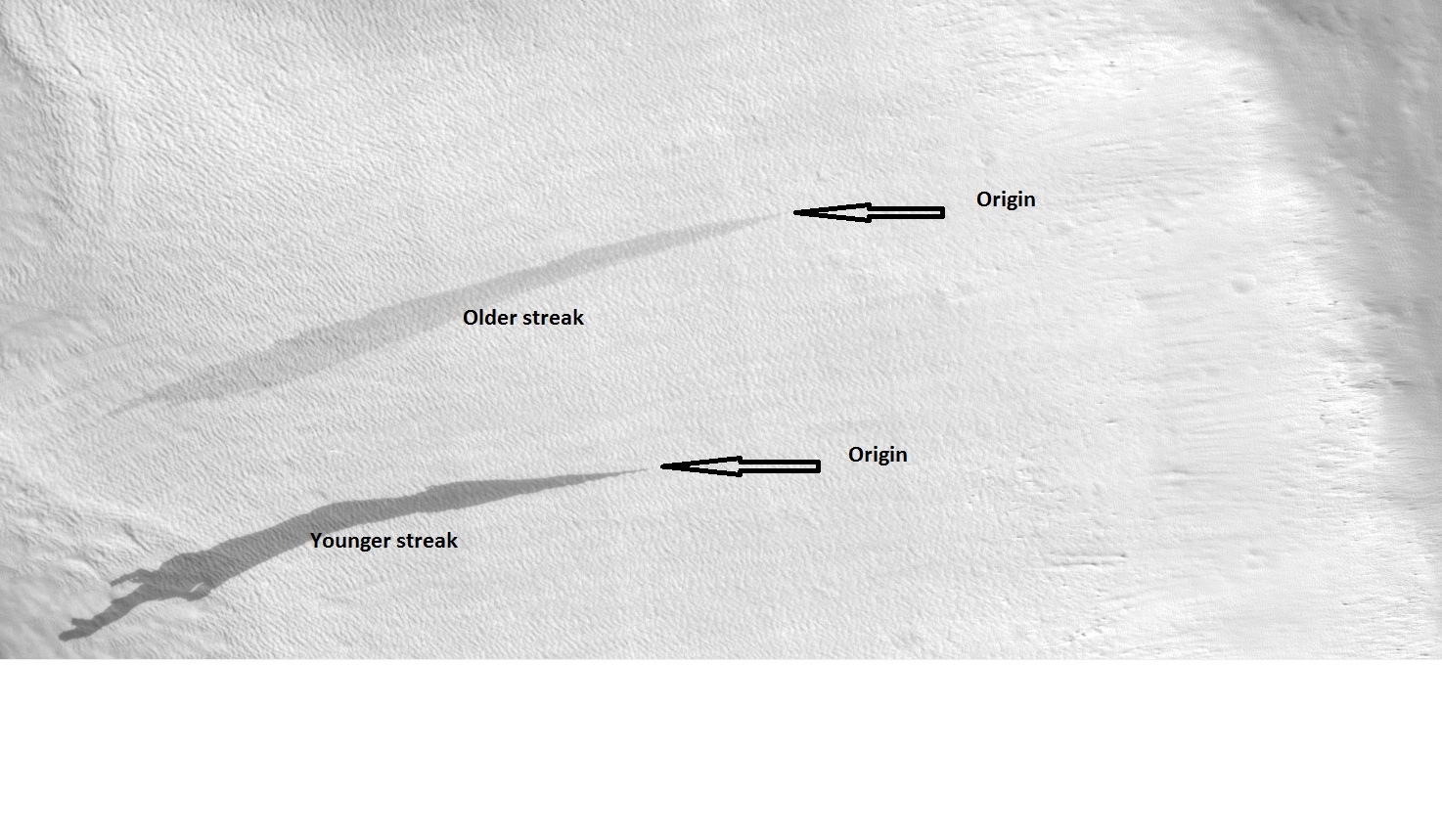
Young and old dark streaks, as seen by HiRISE under HiWish program. Location is Diacria quadrangle.

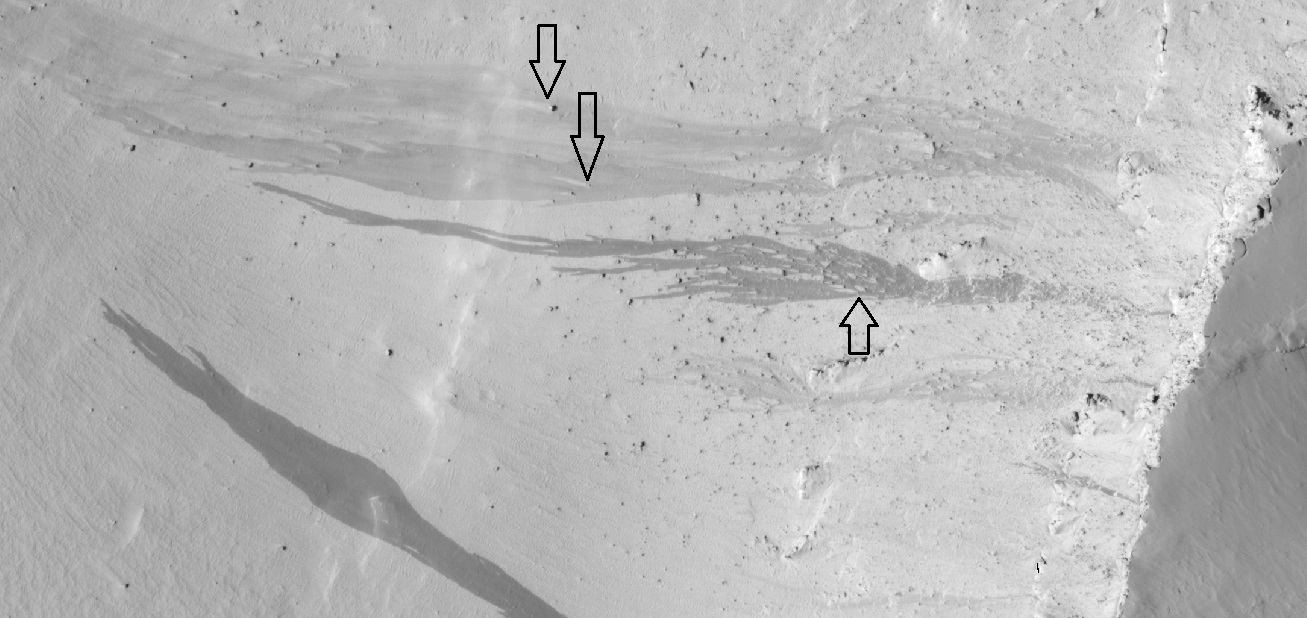
Dark slope streaks, as seen by HiRISE under the HiWish program Arrows show how boulders affected the shape of the streaks.

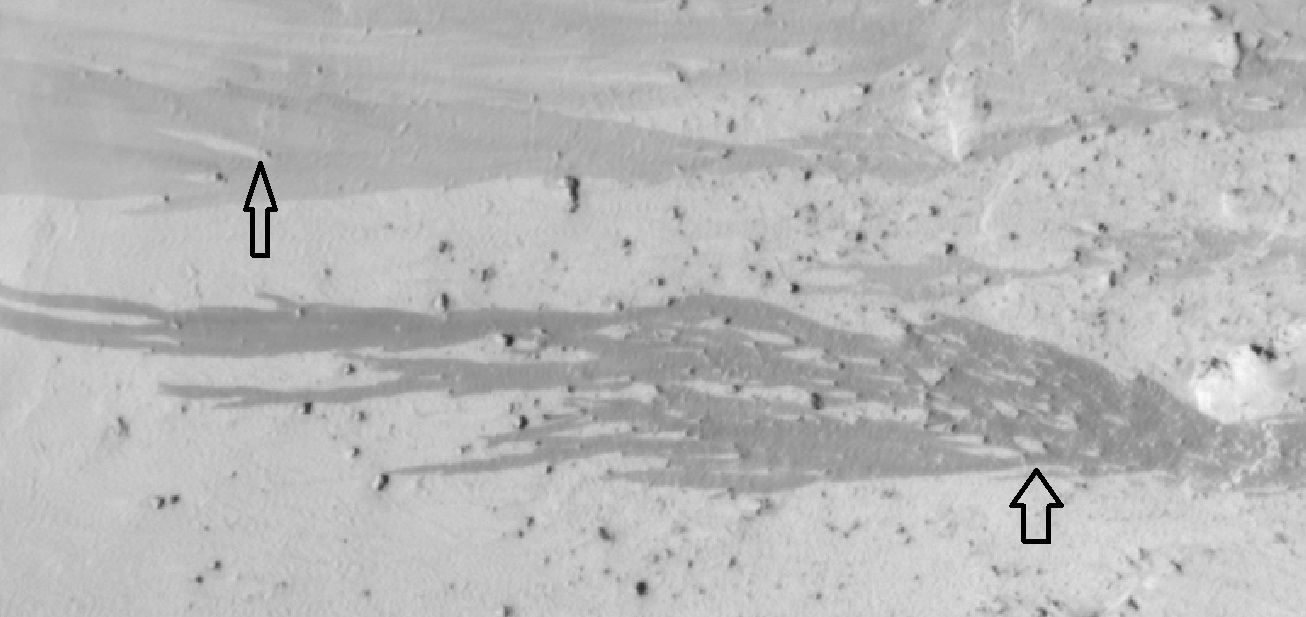
Dark slope streaks, as seen by HiRISE under the HiWish program Arrows show how boulders affected the shape of the streaks.

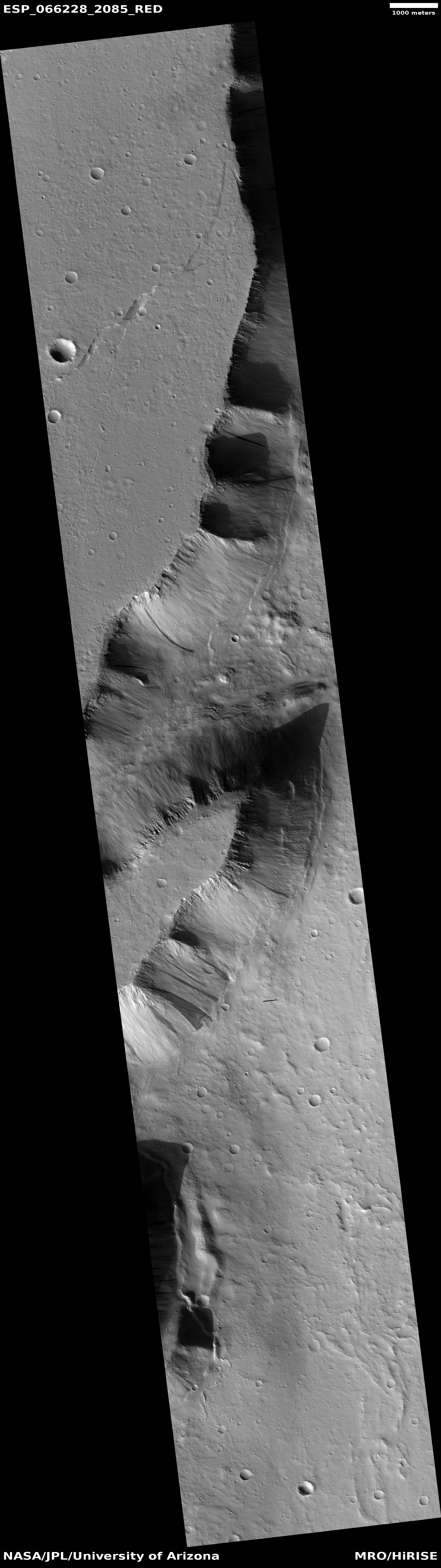
Wide view of mesas with dark slope streaks, as seen by HiRISE under HiWish program

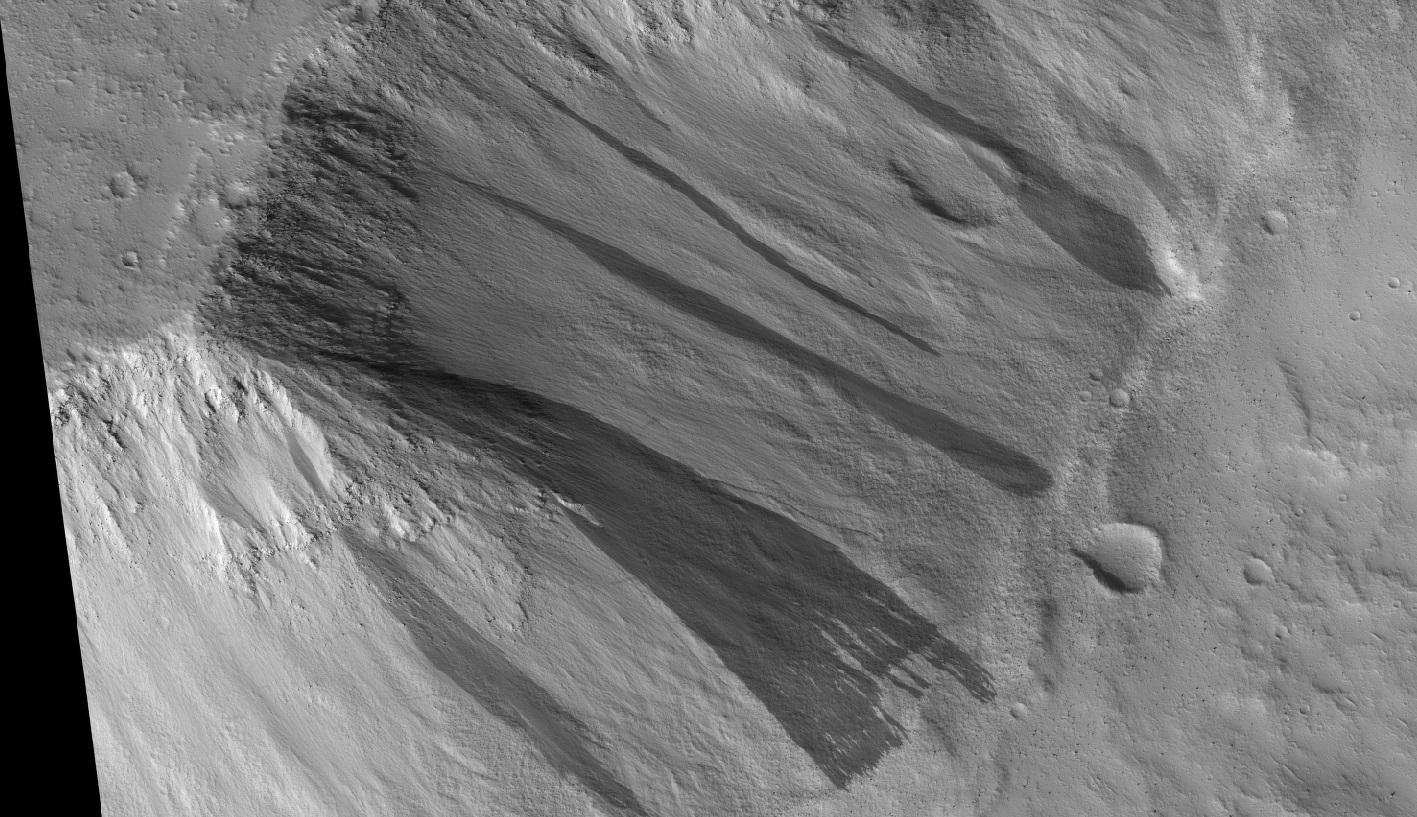
Large group of dark slope streaks along a mesa wall, as seen by HIRISE

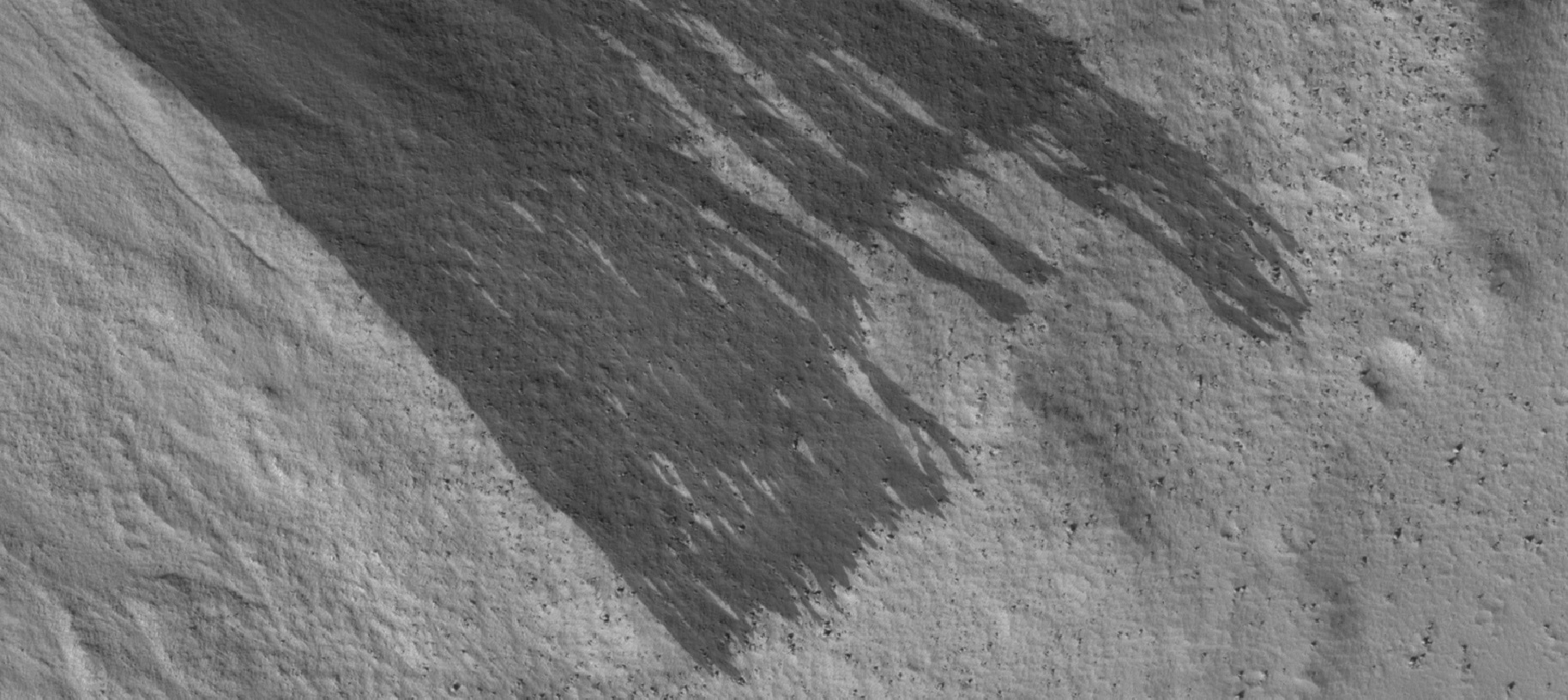
Close view of end of dark slope streaks, as seen by HiRISE

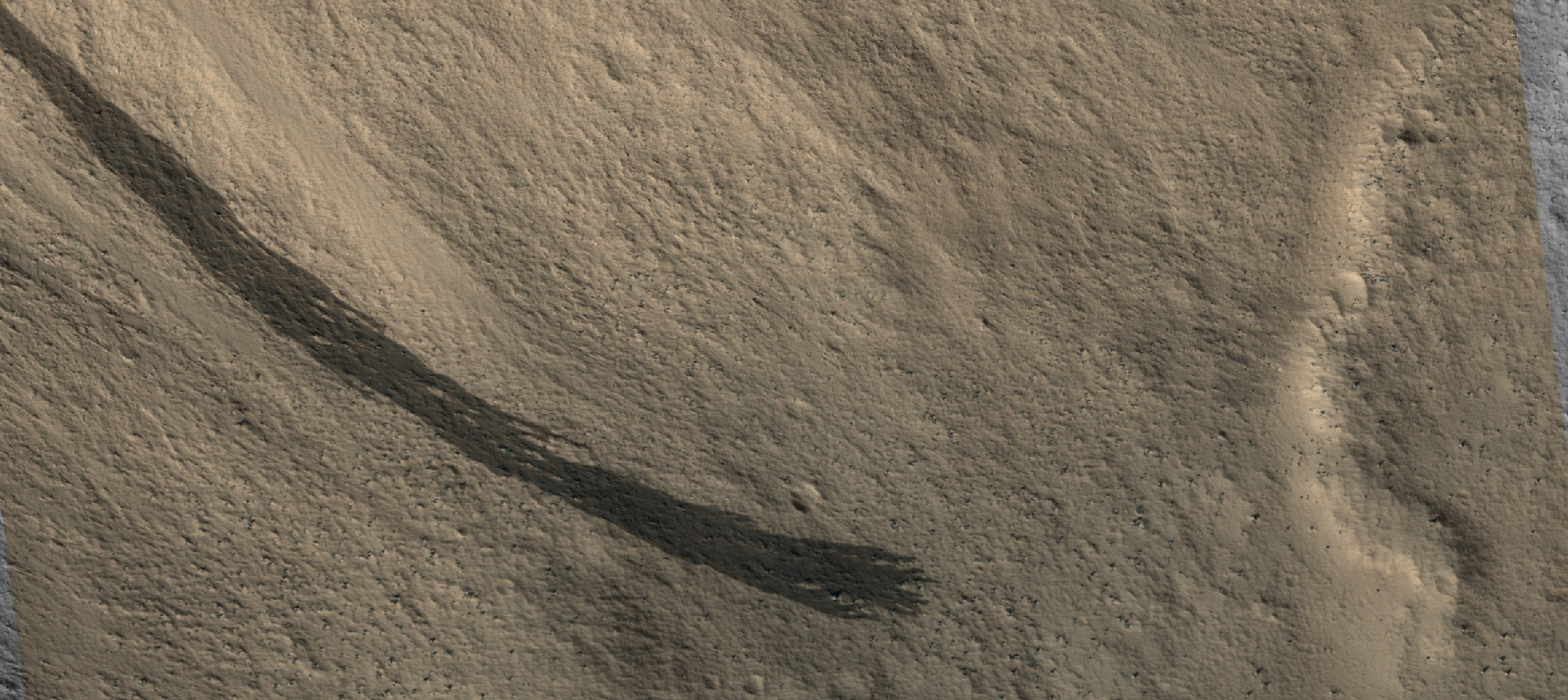
Dark slope streaks along a mesa wall, as seen by HIRISE Picture is about 1 km across.

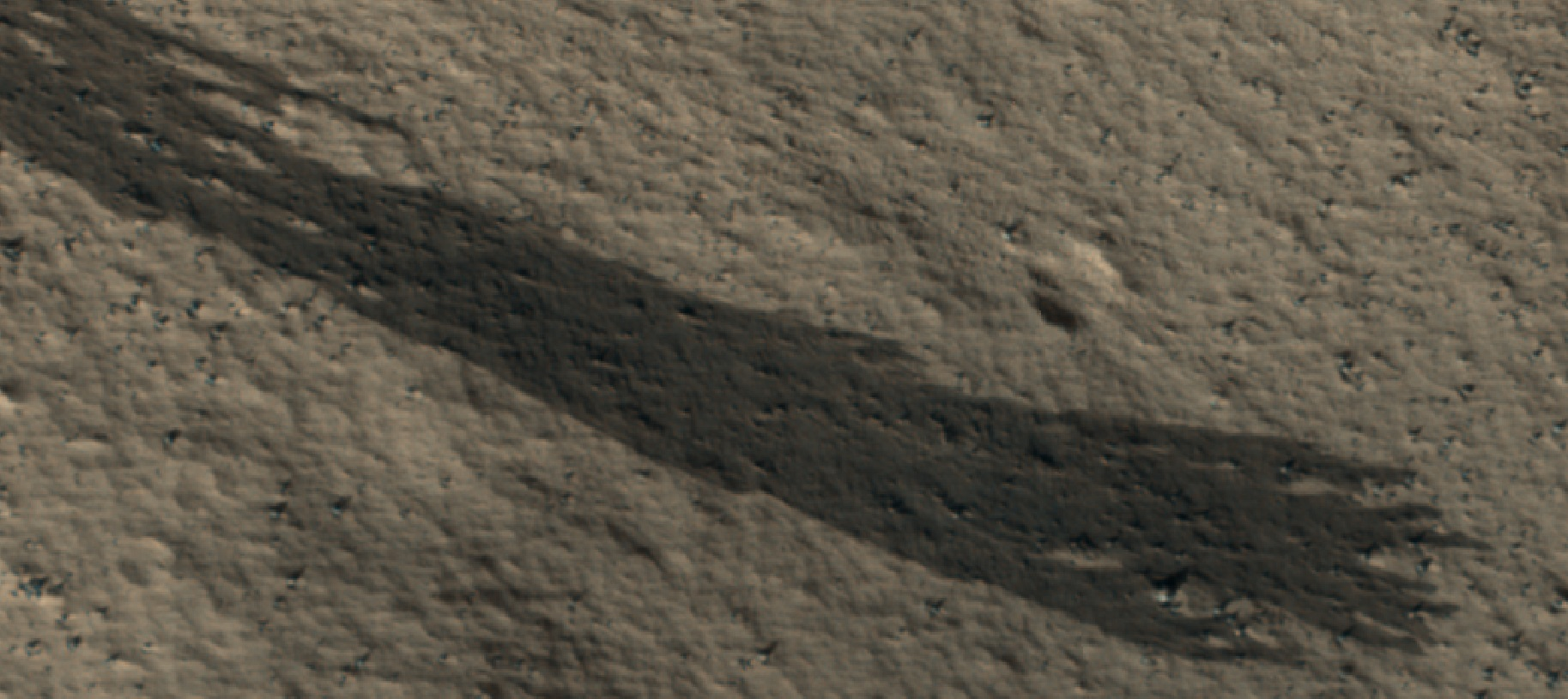
Close view of end of dark slope streaks, as seen by HiRISE

Animation showing changes in streaks on slopes of ridges within the Olympus Mons Aureole. The changes happened in 6 years. Picture was named HiRISE picture of the day for January 13, 2024
