= Loose snow avalanche =

A loose snow avalanche is an avalanche formed in snow with little internal cohesion among individual snow crystals. Usually very few fatalities occur from loose snow avalanches, as the avalanches have a tendency to break beneath the person and are usually small even having a path as small as a few centimeters, and as a result are sometimes called "harmless sloughs" that usually at most cause the person to merely fall. However based on the terrain loose snow avalanches can grow large, and have been known to carry people off a cliff and into a crevass or bury them in a gully, and even completely destroy houses and other similar buildings. Ideal conditions for a loose snow avalanche are steep slope angles of 40 degrees and more, persistent sub-zero temperatures and low humidity, moderate to heavy snowfall, and also in an area where winds are very light or are not affecting the density of the snow. This produces light, fluffy snow that is hard or unable to pack.

Small loose snow avalanches can even be a sign of stability of the snow, as slabs are triggered by a hard layer of snow over a very soft and weak layer of snow, and loose snow avalanches consist of a very soft layer of snow on a hard layer or the ground.

== See also ==
- Slab avalanche
