= Aonia Terra =

Region of the planet Mars

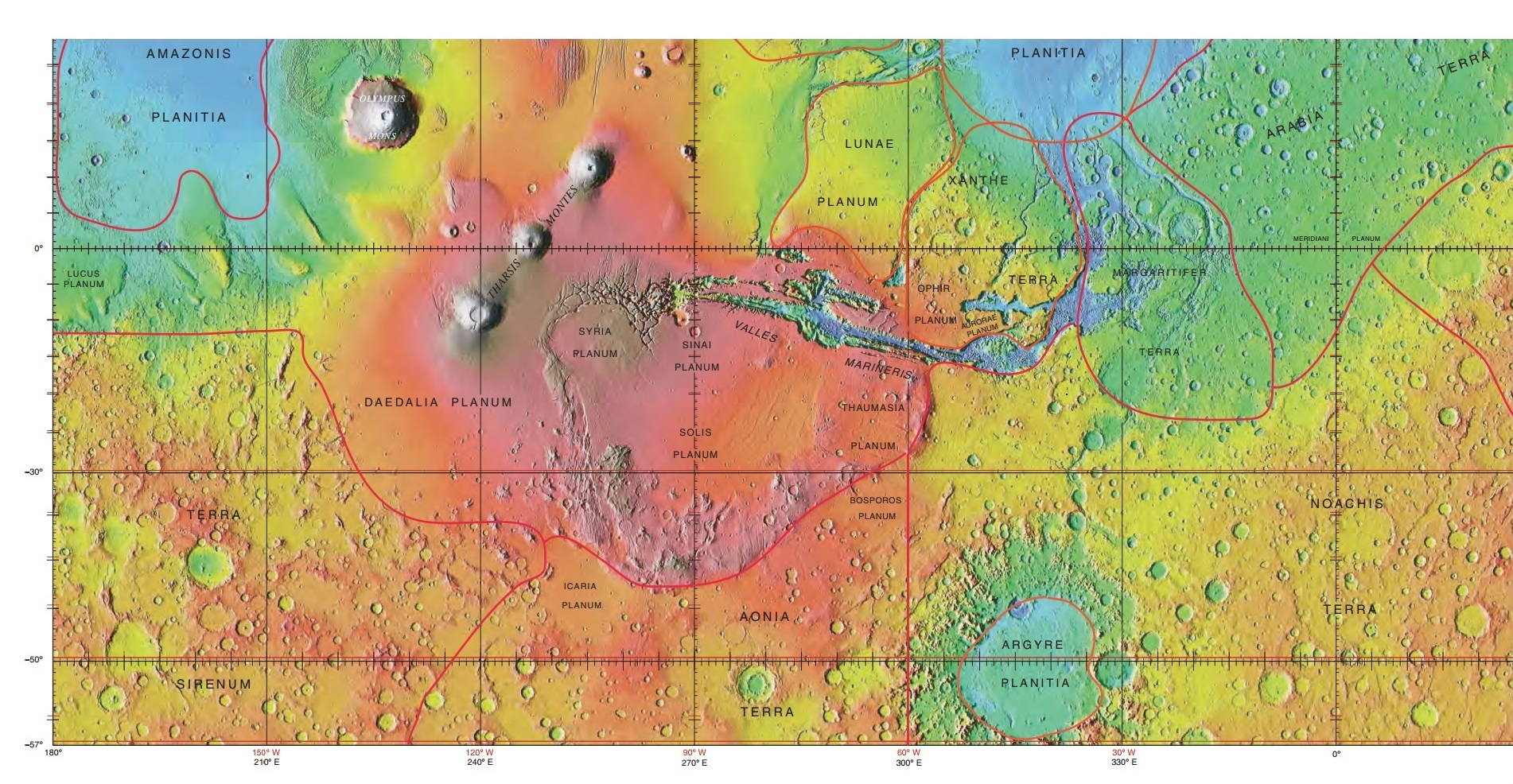
MOLA map showing boundaries of Aonia Terra and other regions

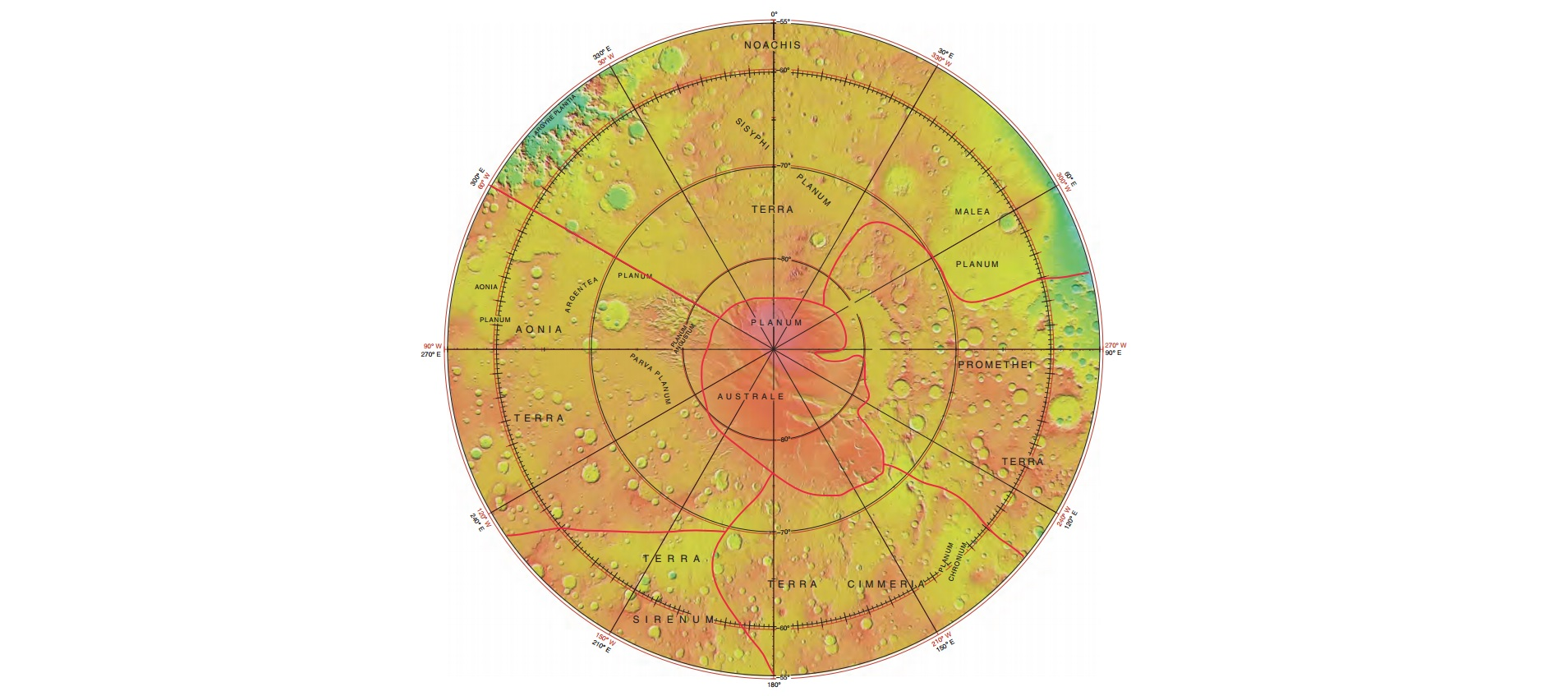
MOLA map showing boundaries of Aonia Terra near the south pole and other regions

Aonia Terra is a region in the southern hemisphere of the planet Mars. It is named after a classical albedo feature Aonia, that was named after the ancient Greek region Aonia.

It is centered at 60°S 97°W and covers 3900 km at its broadest extent. It covers latitudes 30 to 81 South and longitudes 60 to 163 W. Aonia Terra lies in the Phaethontis, Thaumasia and the Australe quadrangles of Mars. Aonia Terra is an upland area notable for massive cratering including the large Lowell Crater, parts of the region features small craters, in the plain areas, Thaumasia Fossae and parts of the southern area. The feature are bordered by Terra Sirenum within the range of Icaria Fossae to the northwest the highland area which includes Claritas and Coracis Fossae as well as Warrego Valles towards the north, Argyre Planitia to the east and Cavi Angusti, Australe Scopuli and Australe Planum to the south.

== Geography ==
The region consists of a few plana (plains) including Aonia, Icaria, Parva and most of Bosporos as well as the west of Argentea Planum. Other features includes Aonia Mons, Aonia Tholus and Phrixi Rupes.

== History ==
Telescopic images were taken during the mid-19th century. It would be known as Aonius Sinus, one of Schiaparelli's feature names and was thought to be a bay of Mare Australe. It bordered Phaethontis, Icaria and Thaumasia Felix. Aonius Sinus became an official IAU name in 1958. The area's first image was taken in 1967 by Mariner 4 and were blurry and those taken in the east had no detail. The remaining detailed images were finally taken by Mariner 9 in 1971 and 1972. further images were taken by the Viking orbiters later in the 1970s. No main feature name was named until Aonius Sinus became Aonia Terra in 1979. As of 2018, it is one of four features named after Aonius.

== Craters ==
=== List of craters ===
The following is a list of craters in Aonia Terra. The crater's central location is of the feature, craters that its central location is in another feature are listed by eastern, western, northern or southern part.

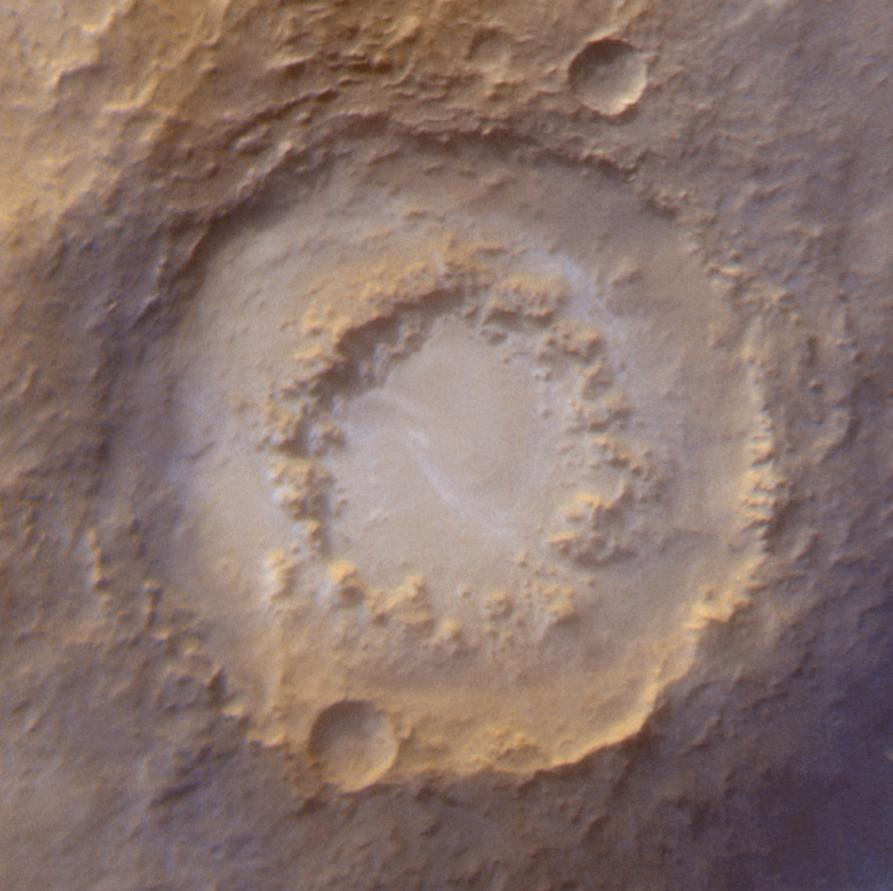
Lowell, the largest crater in Aonia Terra

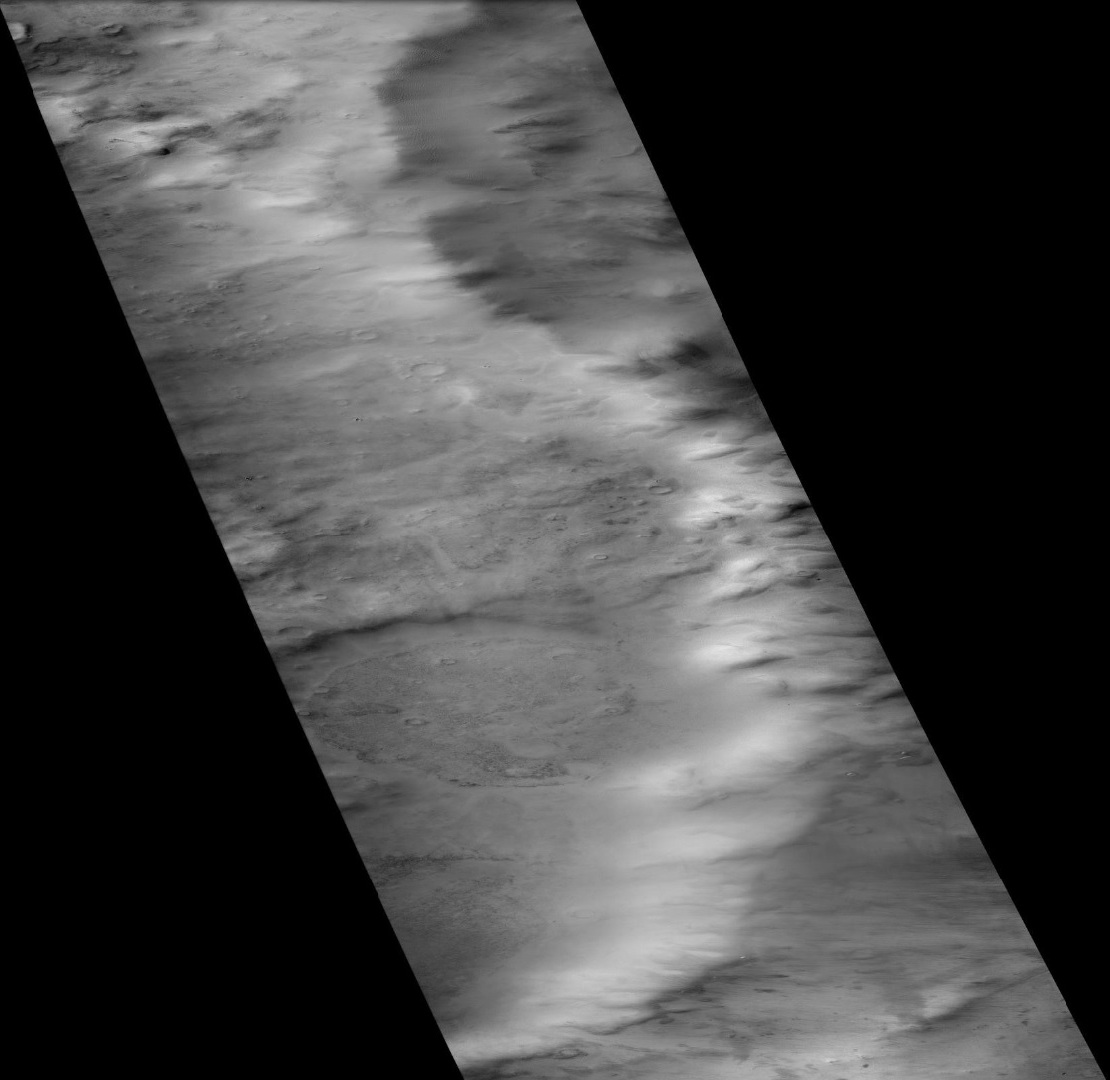
Stoney crater, located in the southwest

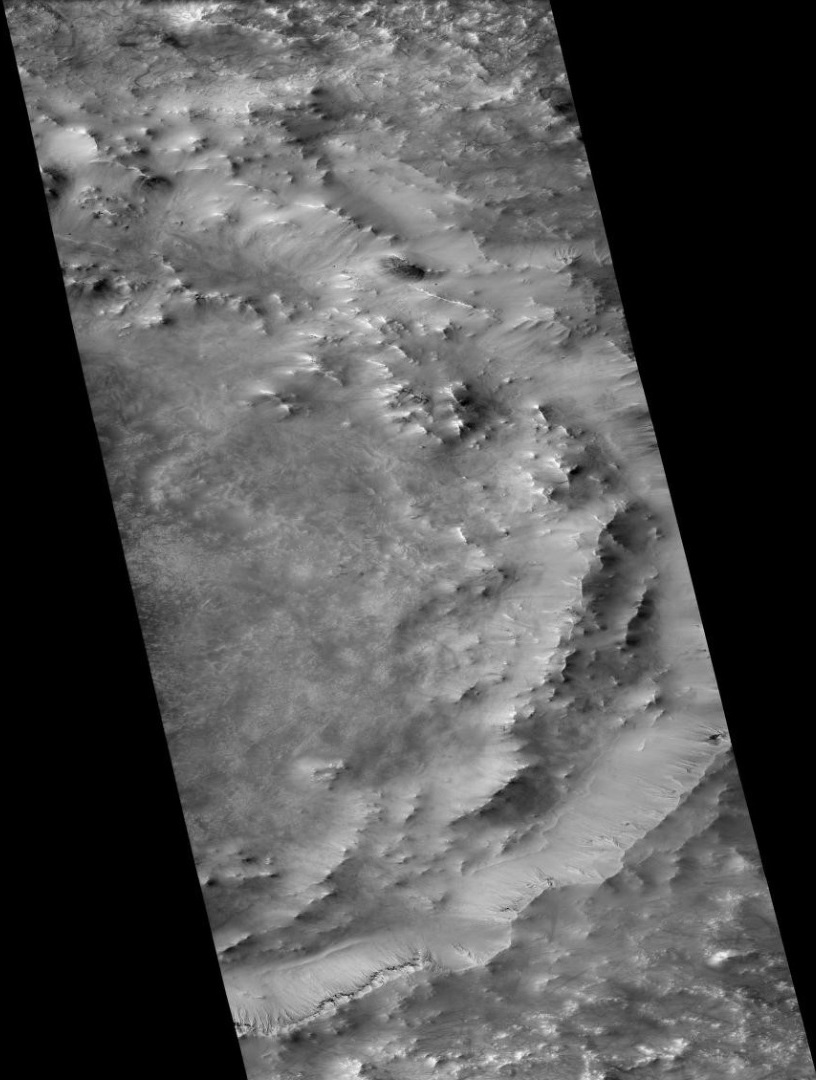
Ross crater, CTX image

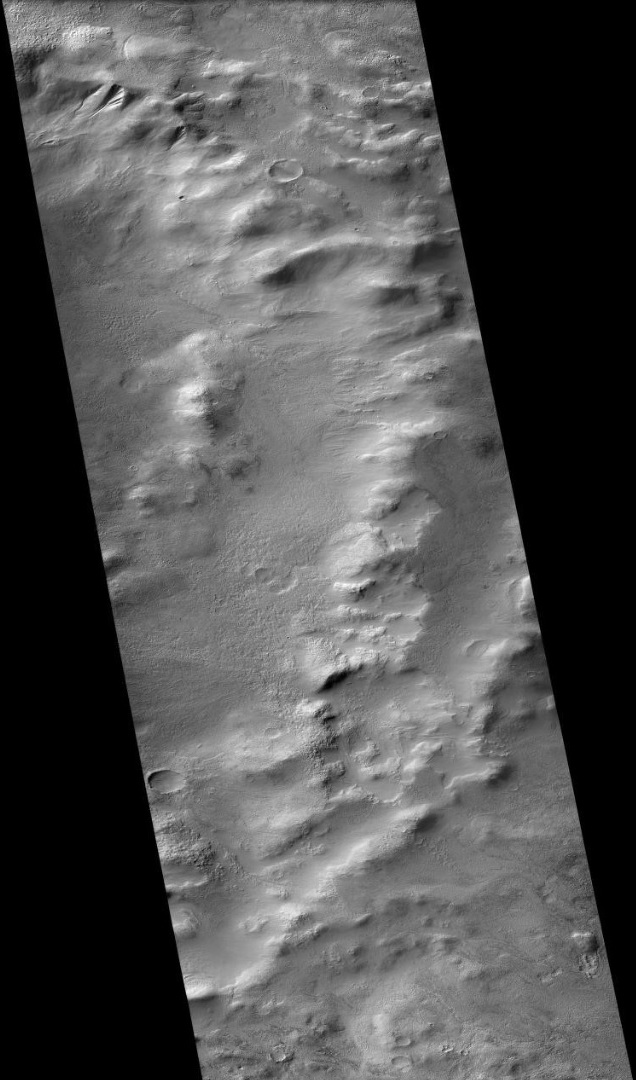
Porter crater, CTX image

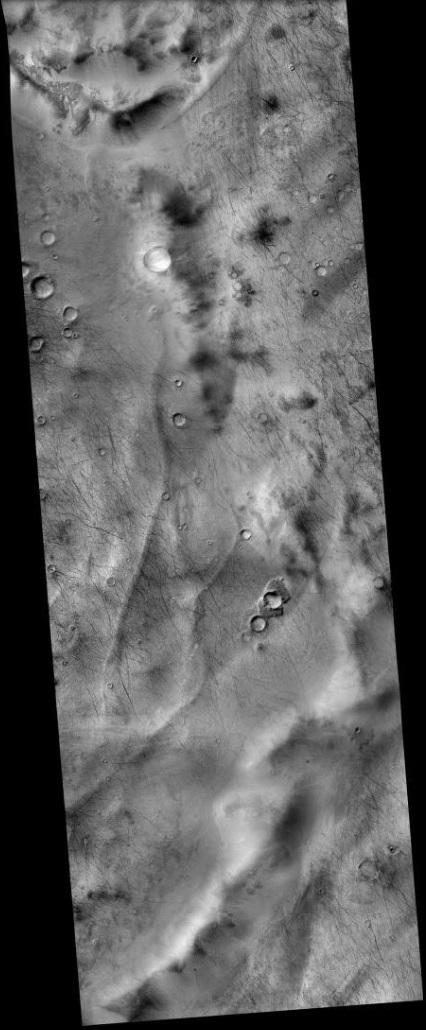
Lau crater, CTX image

| Name | Location | Quadrangle(s) | Diameter | Year of approval |
|---|---|---|---|---|
| Agassiz | 69.8°S 89.9°W | Mare Australe | 108.77 km | 1973 |
| Aki | | Thaumasia | | 1979 |
| Babakin | | Thaumasia | | |
| Bianchini | 64.2°S 95.4°W | Thaumasia | 76 km | 1973 |
| Brashear | 54.14°S 119.03°W | Thaumasia | 77.45 km | 1973 |
| Chamberlin | | Mare Australe, Phaethontis | | |
| Coblentz | 50.3°S 90.3°W | Thaumasia | 112 km | 1973 |
| Dokuchaev | | Phaethontis | | |
| Douglass | 51.8°S 70.6°W | Thaumasia | 94.8 km | 1973 |
| Fontana | | Thaumasia | | 1973 |
| Gari | | Thaumasia | | |
| Heaviside | 70.7°S 95.3°W | Mare Australe | 87.4 km | 1973 |
| Hussey | 59.4°S 173.9°W | Phaethontis | 49 km | 1973 |
| Istok | | Thaumasia | | |
| Kontum | | Thaumasia | | 2006 |
| Kumak | | Thaumasia | | |
| Lamont | 58.6°S 113.6°W | Thaumasia | 76 km | 1973 |
| Lau | 74.4°S 107.8°W | Mare Australe | 104.9 km | 1973 |
| Lowell | 52.3°S 81.4°W | Thaumasia | 203 km | 1973 |
| Playfair | 78.1°S 126.2°W | Mare Australe | 64.2 km | 1973 |
| Porter | 50.8°S 113.9°W | Thaumasia | 105 km | 1973 |
| Reynolds | 75.1°S 157.9°W | Mare Australe | 97.5 km | 1973 |
| Ross | 57.7°S 107.84°W | Thaumasia | 82.51 km | 1973 |
| Slipher | 47.8°S 84.6°W | Thaumasia | 127.14 km | 1973 |
| Smith | | Mare Australe | | |
| Steno | 68°S 115.6°W | Mare Australe | 106.9 km | 1973 |
| Stoney | 69.8°S 138.6°W | Mare Australe | 161.37 km | 1973 |

== Martian gullies ==
Aonia Terra is the location of many Martian gullies that may be due to recent flowing water. Some are found in many craters near the large craters Lowell, Douglass and Ross. Gullies occur on steep slopes, especially on the walls of craters. Gullies are believed to be relatively young because they have few, if any craters. Moreover, they lie on top of sand dunes which themselves are considered to be quite young. Usually, each gully has an alcove, channel, and apron. Some studies have found that gullies occur on slopes that face all directions, others have found that the greater number of gullies are found on poleward facing slopes, especially from 30 to 44 S.

Although many ideas have been put forward to explain them, the most popular involve liquid water coming from an aquifer, from melting at the base of old glaciers, or from the melting of ice in the ground when the climate was warmer. Because of the good possibility that liquid water was involved with their formation and that they could be very young, scientists are excited. Maybe the gullies are where we should go to find life.

There is evidence for all three theories. Most of the gully alcove heads occur at the same level, just as one would expect of an aquifer. Various measurements and calculations show that liquid water could exist in aquifers at the usual depths where gullies begin. One variation of this model is that rising hot magma could have melted ice in the ground and caused water to flow in aquifers. Aquifers are layer that allow water to flow. They may consist of porous sandstone. The aquifer layer would be perched on top of another layer that prevents water from going down (in geological terms it would be called impermeable). Because water in an aquifer is prevented from going down, the only direction the trapped water can flow is horizontally. Eventually, water could flow out onto the surface when the aquifer reaches a break—like a crater wall. The resulting flow of water could erode the wall to create gullies. Aquifers are quite common on Earth. A good example is "Weeping Rock" in Zion National Park Utah.

As for the next theory, much of the surface of Mars is covered by a thick smooth mantle that is thought to be a mixture of ice and dust. This ice-rich mantle, a few yards thick, smooths the land, but in places it has a bumpy texture, resembling the surface of a basketball. The mantle may be like a glacier and under certain conditions the ice that is mixed in the mantle could melt and flow down the slopes and make gullies. Because there are few craters on this mantle, the mantle is relatively young. The ice-rich mantle may be the result of climate changes. Changes in Mars's orbit and tilt cause significant changes in the distribution of water ice from polar regions down to latitudes equivalent to Texas. During certain climate periods water vapor leaves polar ice and enters the atmosphere. The water comes back to ground at lower latitudes as deposits of frost or snow mixed generously with dust. The atmosphere of Mars contains a great deal of fine dust particles. Water vapor will condense on the particles, then fall down to the ground due to the additional weight of the water coating. When Mars is at its greatest tilt or obliquity, up to 2 cm of ice could be removed from the summer ice cap and deposited at midlatitudes. This movement of water could last for several thousand years and create a snow layer of up to around 10 meters thick. When ice at the top of the mantling layer goes back into the atmosphere, it leaves behind dust, which insulating the remaining ice. Measurements of altitudes and slopes of gullies support the idea that snowpacks or glaciers are associated with gullies. Steeper slopes have more shade which would preserve snow.

Higher elevations have far fewer gullies because ice would tend to sublimate more in the thin air of the higher altitude.

The third theory might be possible since climate changes may be enough to simply allow ice in the ground to melt and thus form the gullies. During a warmer climate, the first few meters of ground could thaw and produce a "debris flow" similar to those on the dry and cold Greenland east coast. Since the gullies occur on steep slopes only a small decrease of the shear strength of the soil particles is needed to begin the flow. Small amounts of liquid water from melted ground ice could be enough. Calculations show that a third of a mm of runoff can be produced each day for 50 days of each Martian year, even under current conditions.

== Defrosting ==
As the temperature warms and more sunlight becomes available in the spring, frost starts to disappear. These occur in the southern portion of the region that is also included in the Mare Australe quadrangle (e.g. Heaviside and Stoney). This process begins with the appearance of dark spots. By the time the temperature rises to the melting point of water ice, all ice is gone. The process was first followed with repeated images by the Mars Global Surveyor. With the much greater resolution of HiRISE, it was seen that many spots had the shape of fans.

== See also ==
- Climate of Mars
- Geology of Mars
- Glaciers on Mars
- Groundwater on Mars
- Martian gullies

== Recommended reading ==
- Grotzinger, John P.; Milliken, Ralph Edward (2012). Sedimentary Geology of Mars. Society for Sedimentary Geology. ISBN 978-1-56576-313-5.
- Lorenz, Ralph D. (2014). "The Dune Whisperers" (PDF). The Planetary Report. 34 (1): 8–14.
- Lorenz, Ralph D.; Zimbelman, James R. (2014). Dune Worlds: How Windblown Sand Shapes Planetary Landscapes. Springer Science & Business Media. ISBN 978-3-540-89725-5.
