= Porter (Martian crater) =

- Porter crater rim, as seen with Mars Global Surveyor.
- Planet: Mars
- Region: Aonia Terra
- Coordinates: 50.8°S 113.9°W
- Quadrangle: Thaumasia
- Diameter: 105 km
- Eponym: Russell W. Porter

Porter is a large-scale impact crater in the Thaumasia quadrangle on the planet Mars, situated in Aonia Terra at 50.8° south and 113.9º west. The impact caused a bowl 105 kilometres (65 mi) across. The name was chosen in 1973 by the International Astronomical Union in honour of the US astronomer and explorer, Russell W. Porter (1871-1949).

Impact craters generally have a rim with ejecta around them, in contrast volcanic craters usually do not have a rim or ejecta deposits. As craters get larger (greater than 10 km in diameter) they usually have a central peak. The peak is caused by a rebound of the crater floor following the impact.

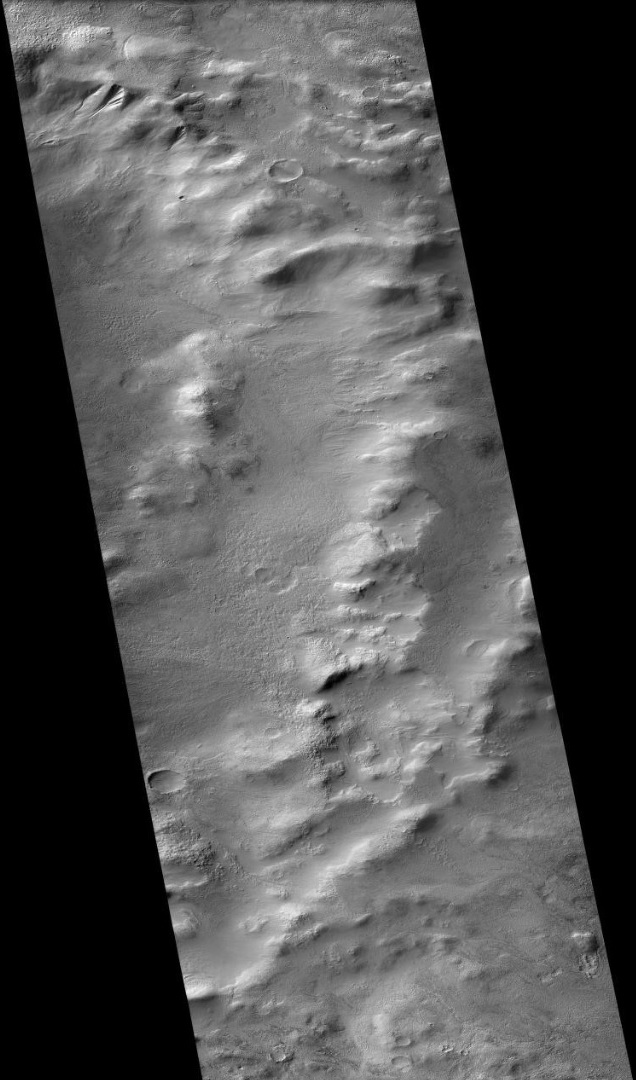
Porter Crater, as seen by CTX camera (on Mars Reconnaissance Orbiter). Gullies are visible in the upper left.

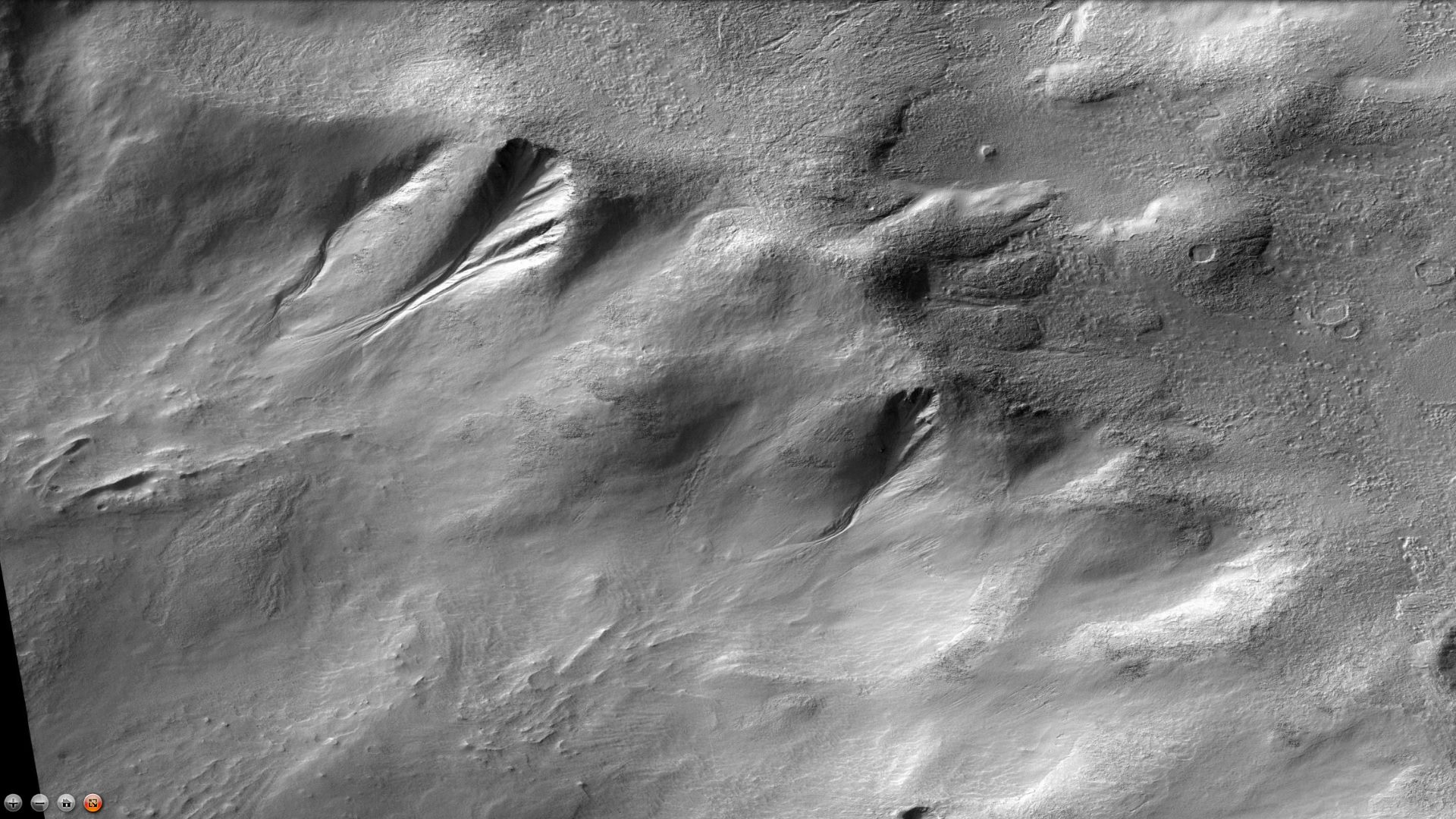
Gullies in Porter Crater, as seen by CTX camera (on Mars Reconnaissance Orbiter). Note: this is an enlargement of the previous photo.

== See also ==
- Climate of Mars
- Geology of Mars
- HiRISE
- List of craters on Mars
- Martian gullies
- Ore resources on Mars
- Planetary nomenclature
- Water on Mars

== Sources ==
- Porter on Google Mars.
- USGS Gazetteer of Planetary Nomenclature.
