= Warrego Valles =

Valles on Mars

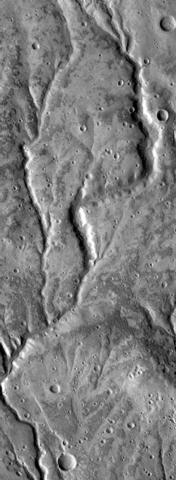
- Channels near the Warrego Valles, as seen by THEMIS. These branched channels are strong evidence for flowing water on Mars, perhaps during a much warmer period.
- Coordinates: 42.2°S 93°W

The Warrego Valles are a set of channels in an ancient river valley in the Thaumasia quadrangle of Mars, located at 42.2° south latitude and 93° west longitude. They are 188 km long and were named after a river in Australia.

Mariner 9 and Viking Orbiter images showed a network of branching valleys in Thaumasia called the Warrego Valles. These networks are evidence that Mars may have once been warmer, wetter, and perhaps had precipitation in the form of rain or snow. At first glance they resemble river valleys on Earth. But sharper images from more advanced cameras reveal that the valleys are not continuous. They are very old and may have been eroded. A picture below shows some of these branching valleys. A study with the Mars Orbiter Laser Altimeter, Thermal Emission Imaging System (THEMIS) and the Mars Orbiter Camera (MOC) support the idea that the Warrego Valles were formed from precipitation.

== Formation ==
Planetary scans display evidence of rainfall related processes such as fluvial erosion. However, the digitate pattern formed by the system is most consistent with ground-water sapping processes. It formed in the southern highlands by tectonic fractures dated to be early Hesperian cross cut and have in turn been cross cut by the valley system. This implies that Warrego Valles was still actively forming well into the Hesperian Era.

== See also ==
- Climate on Mars
- Geology of Mars
- Lunae Palus quadrangle
- Outflow channels
- Valley network (Mars)
- Vallis (planetary geology)
- Water on Mars
