= Lowell (Martian crater) =

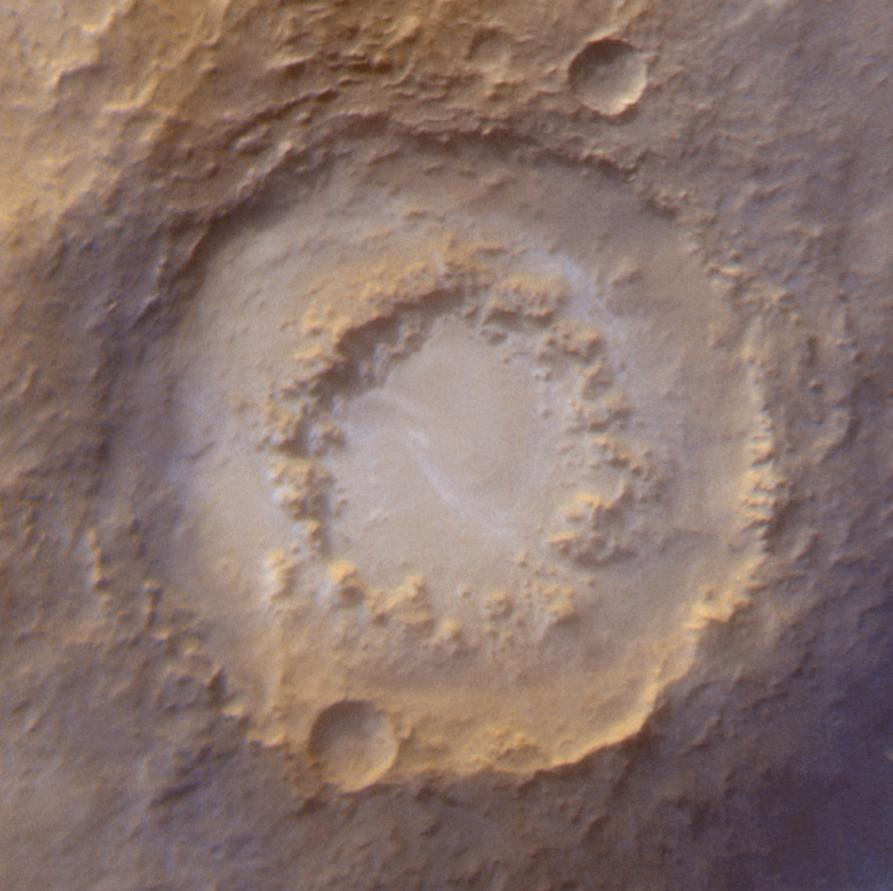
- The crater Lowell, exhibiting frost deposits on its floor.
- Planet: Mars
- Coordinates: 52.3°S 81.4°W
- Quadrangle: Thaumasia
- Diameter: 203.0 km (126.1 mi)
- Eponym: Percival Lowell

The Lowell crater is a large impact crater on Aonia Terra in the Thaumasia quadrangle of Mars. The crater is about 203 kilometers (127 miles) in diameter. Lowell is an example of a well-preserved peak ring crater on Mars.

Lowell's ejecta blanket and associated secondary craters are dissected by channels.

Nearby features include the craters Slipher to the north, Douglass to the east, and Coblentz to the southwest, the small mountain Aonia Mons to the west, and Aonia Planum to the southeast.

Lowell crater is named for Percival Lowell who built the Lowell Observatory in Flagstaff, Arizona, in 1894, and then started observing Mars intensively for years. He used the observatory and his large refractor telescope to discover what he believed were over 500 canals on Mars. Lowell promoted the idea that they were constructed by an intelligent race of Martians. However, when pictures were received from spacecraft, the canals were found to be optical illusions. Nevertheless, much of the later interest in Mars exploration resulted from the efforts of Lowell.

== See also ==
- List of craters on Mars
