= Valley network (Mars) =

Branching networks of valleys on Mars

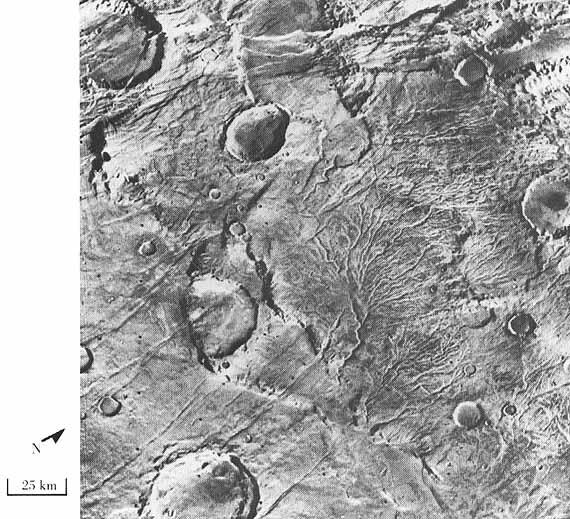
Branched valley network in Thaumasia quadrangle, as seen by Viking Orbiter. Field of view is roughly 200 km across.

Valley networks are branching networks of valleys on Mars that superficially resemble terrestrial river drainage basins. They are found mainly incised into the terrain of the Martian southern highlands, and are typically - though not always - of Noachian age (approximately four billion years old). The individual valleys are typically less than 5 kilometers wide, though they may extend for up to hundreds or even thousands of kilometers across the Martian surface.

The form, distribution, and implied evolution of the valley networks are of great importance for what they may tell us about the history of liquid water on the Martian surface, and hence Mars's climate history. Some authors have argued that the properties of the networks demand that a hydrological cycle must have been active on ancient Mars, though this remains contentious. Objections chiefly arise from repeated results from models of martian paleoclimate suggesting high enough temperatures and pressures to sustain liquid water on the surface have not ever been possible on Mars.

The advent of very high-resolution images of the surface from the HiRISE, THEMIS and Context (CTX) satellite cameras as well as the Mars Orbital Laser Altimeter (MOLA) digital terrain models have drastically improved our understanding of the networks in the last decade.

== Form ==
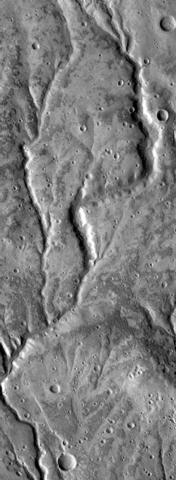
Part of a valley network near Warrego Valles, seen by THEMIS. Length of image is roughly 50 km.

The valleys of the networks are typically narrow (<0.5–4 km) and 50–200 m deep, with neither value changing consistently along their lengths. Their cross-sectional form tends to evolve from V-shaped in the headwaters to U-shaped in the lower reaches. The individual valleys form interconnected branching networks, typically less than 200 km long and draining into local topographic lows. The form of the tributary valleys is commonly described as "stubby" or a similar term, implying short lengths away from the trunk streams and amphitheater-like terminations at their heads. Many authors have described the drainage density of the networks as typically much lower than would be seen on Earth, though the extent to which this may be an artifact of image resolution, landscape degradation or observer bias has also been raised in the literature.

However, more recent imagery has also emphasized that the term "valley network" incorporates a large variety of different valley forms across a number of different scales in different Martian geological settings. Any branched valley system on a scale smaller than an outflow channel can be termed a valley network, probably incorporating a large variety of geomorphological formation processes. Some valley networks run for over 2000 km across the Martian landscape. Some may change width downstream. Some have drainage densities which do match some terrestrial values. Narrower, less deep valley networks are present, but probably are more rare than their larger equivalents.

In most valley networks, later aeolian processes have deposited wind-blown sediments in the bottoms of the valleys, obscuring the nature of the channel which must have cut them. On Earth, a valley is a depression with a flat floor, across which migrates a channel, which carries the water discharge. Due to the later deposits on Mars, however, in almost all cases it is unclear whether the valley floors contain individual channel structures or whether they are fully inundated in flow events. Nanedi Valles is a rare example where a channel has been identified, though new higher resolution imagery again continues to reveal more such structures with time. This accounts for the preference in the literature for the term "valley network" rather than "channel network", though some work tends to confuse the two in interpretation of these structures.

== Distribution and age ==
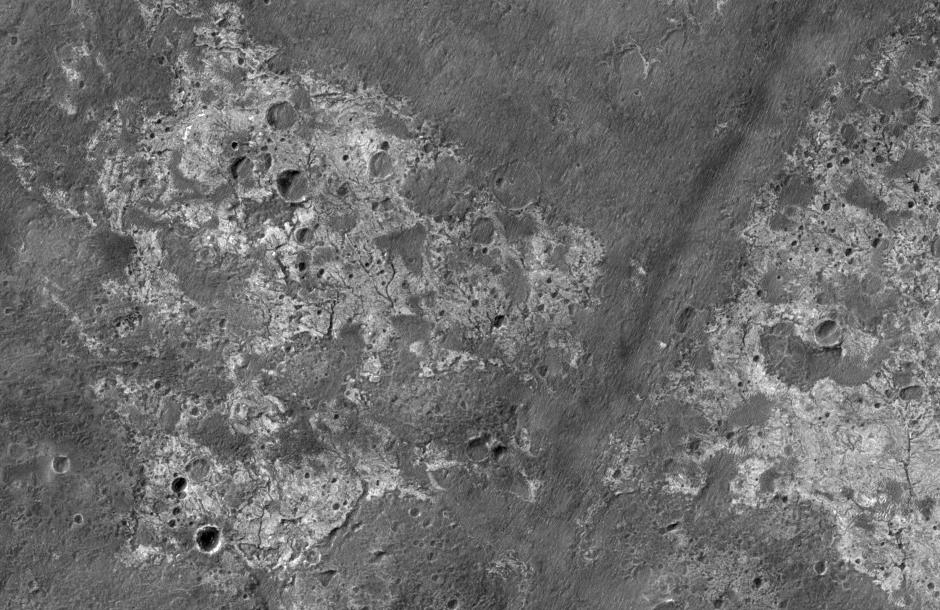
Finer scale valley networks near Candor Chasma, seen by HiRISE (click to zoom). Field of view is roughly 3.5 km across. Surface the valleys are cut into appears to be eroding back.

Valley networks are very strongly concentrated in the cratered southern uplands of Mars. The Hesperian-age lava plains of the northern hemisphere are in general almost entirely undissected. However, there are significant numbers of exceptions to this generalization - in particular, many of the Hesperian and younger volcanoes carry networks, as well as several other areas. These valleys also appear qualitatively "fresher" and less degraded than those in the highlands (e.g., Nanedi Vallis).

However, at finer scales than this the distribution of the valleys where present is highly patchy and discontinuous. Within the highlands, it is not unusual to find heavily dissected slopes immediately adjacent to almost entirely unmodified surfaces, both at valley and catchment scales. The valleys are also regionally clustered, with little dissection in Northwest Arabia and southwest and southeast of Hellas, but much in Terra Cimmeria and just south of the equator from 20°E to 180°E. They are also much more prominent on steeper slopes, for example on crater rims, but again may only be present on one side of such a rim.

Unfortunately, the generally small size of individual catchments and the relative narrowness of their constituent valleys means that dating the valley networks by conventional crater counting techniques is extremely difficult (though not impossible). The concentration of the valleys in the Noachian-age southern highlands and their sparsity on the northern Hesperian plains, circumstantially combined with independent estimates of a multi-order of magnitude decrease in global martian erosion rates at the end of the Noachian, probably indicates that most of the networks were cut during this early interval. However, the channels on Hesperian surfaces unambiguously demonstrate that valley-forming processes did continue at least in some locations at least some of the time after the Noachian. Some crater counting evidence even suggests some highland networks may have formed in the Amazonian.

== Formation and implications for Martian climate history ==
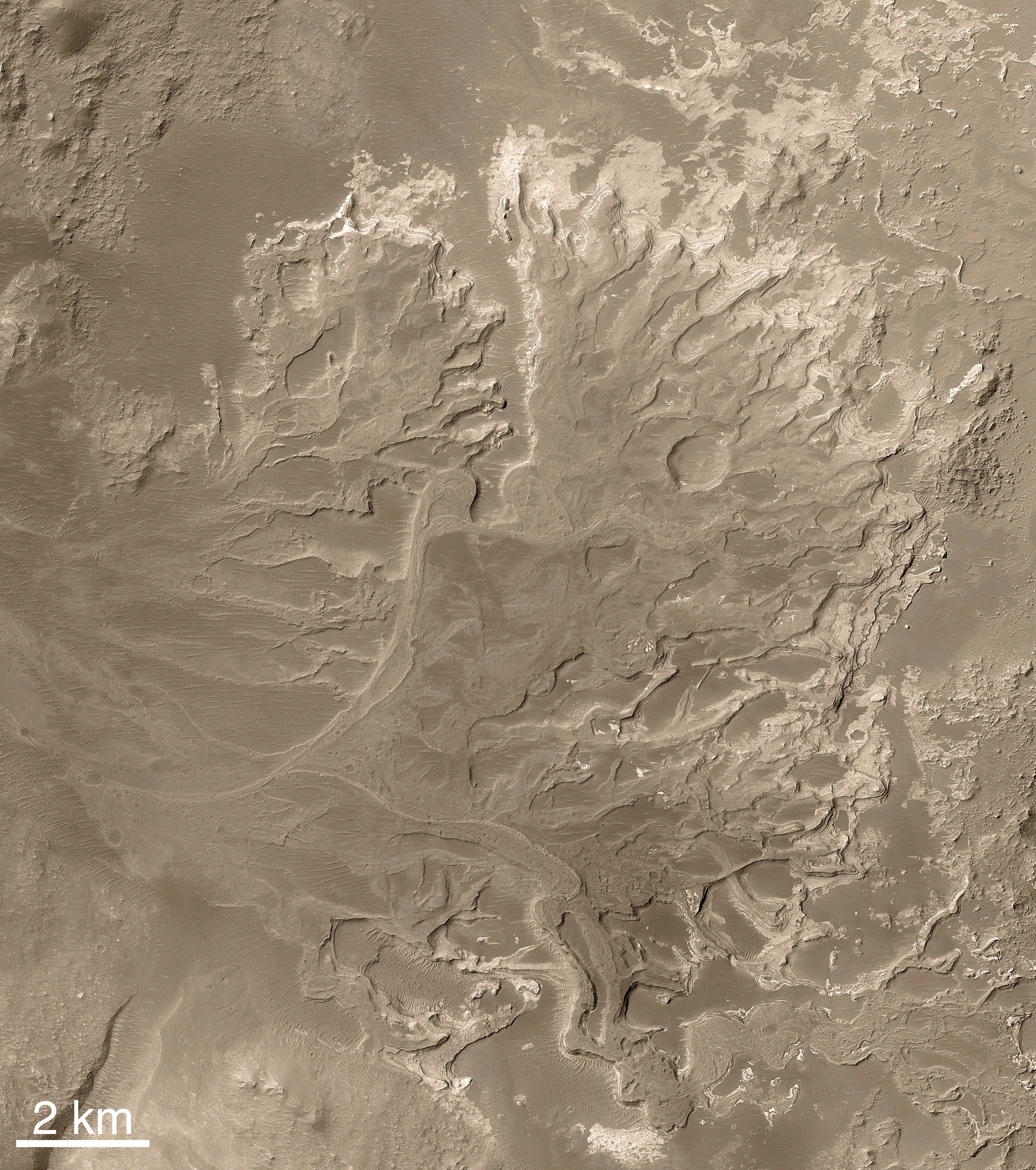
The Eberswalde delta, seen by MGS. Note the meanders with cutoffs, now seen in inverted relief.

Mechanisms and implied environments for the formation of the valleys remain contentious. Processes as diverse as glaciation, mass wasting, faulting, and erosion by CO_{2}, wind and lava have all been invoked at some point in the formation of some networks, and may play important roles locally in some regions on Mars. Most authors however agree that liquid water must have played a role in the formation of the bulk of the valleys, largely on the basis of both the known widespread distribution of ice on Mars and also the physical properties of liquid water (e.g., viscosity) that almost uniquely allow it to flow thousands of kilometers downhill as streams. Channel features on what are interpreted as eroded deltas at the foot of some networks (e.g., in Eberswalde crater) are also uniquely associated with formation by flowing water - for example, meandering, sinuous channels with meander cutoffs, which have internally consistent hydraulic geometries corresponding very closely to what would be expected in fluvial channels on Earth. Independent lines of evidence also suggest the existence of liquid water at or very near the surface at various times in Martian history, for example, evaporites at Meridiani Planum and pervasive aqueous alteration of rocks in the Columbia Hills, both investigated by the Mars Exploration Rovers.

Beyond this, there are several different scenarios that have been advanced to account for the form and distribution in both space and time of the valleys. Each has its own set of implications regarding the paleoclimate of Mars at the time of formation of the networks. Some of these are summarized below. It is also worth emphasizing that, as on Earth, different formation mechanisms are likely to operate at different times and places on the surface of Mars.

In August 2020 scientists reported that valley networks in the southern highlands of Mars may have been formed mostly under glaciers, not free-flowing rivers of water, indicating that early Mars was colder than thought and that extensive glaciation likely occurred in its past.

=== 1. Business as usual, groundwater under ice: Cold, dry Mars ===
This scenario seeks to describe the formation of the valley networks without appeal to conditions or processes different from those already known to exist on Mars today. Modeling indicates that seeps of groundwater could occur on the surface even under modern conditions, but will freeze very quickly. However, under this suggestion ice cover could insulate the water flowing beneath it well enough to allow long-distance transport (and associated erosion), much like a lava tube insulates the molten lava inside it.

The valleys typically have many features that on Earth are commonly (though not exclusively) associated with groundwater sapping - for instance, amphitheater-like headwalls, constant valley width downstream, flat or U-shaped floors and steep walls. However, without some recharge mechanism for the putative aquifers producing this seepage, i.e., a hydrologic cycle of some kind, it is extremely unlikely that enough water could seep to cut all of the valleys formed in the Noachian. In spite of this, this basic model may remain useful in understanding the more limited valleys formed later in the Hesperian and Amazonian.

=== 2. Groundwater sources, hydrological cycle: Cold, wet Mars ===
These models expand upon the cold, dry Mars model by envisioning mechanisms whereby subsurface aquifers providing groundwater might be recharged in early Mars history. They thus require a sustained water cycle of some sort on the long term in the Noachian, but do not explicitly require that this water be liquid or fall as precipitation. This means Mars need not be warm (i.e., above freezing) in its early history, in accordance with current climate models.

==== Global groundwater circulation ====
It has been proposed that the aquifers could be recharged on geological time scales by a sequence of sublimation of the frozen seeps, atmospheric circulation of the vapor to the southern polar ice cap, redeposition of this onto the cap, basal melting under the ice mass, and groundwater circulation on a global scale. This mechanism is appealing as it requires little conjecture about radically different past climate, and fits well with independent theories on the origins of the martian outflow channels at chaos terrains as major aquifer breaches. However, the hydrostatic head supplied by this mechanism could not feed the numerous channels at elevations greater than the base of the southern polar cap.

==== Local groundwater circulation ====
A related model suggests that locally generated heat could produce local scale groundwater seepage and recharge, either by intrusive volcanism or impact heating. However, this version struggles to explain the longer, larger valley networks - if water flows hundreds or thousands of kilometers away from the heat source, ground will again be frozen and recharge will not be possible once again.

=== 3. Full active hydrological cycle: Warm, wet Mars ===
Many of the Noachian valley networks have features strongly indicative of an origin from distributed precipitation: branched networks, valleys starting at narrow crests, V-shaped cross profiles, diffusional behavior of hillslopes. Conversely, using only geomorphic evidence, it is very challenging to build a strong argument against origin by precipitation. Precipitation also provides a straightforward recharge mechanism for subsurface aquifers, which doubtlessly do exist and are important in some cases (as on Earth). This precipitation may have occurred as rain or snow (with subsequent melt on the ground), but either demands a significantly more humid, and thus warmer and thicker, atmosphere than presently exists. A warmer, wetter Noachian is also supported by independent observations of rock weathering rates, Noachian-age crater lakes, and Noachian geology at the lander sites.

The chief difficulty with this model is that Martian climate simulations have difficulty reliably simulating a warm, wet Noachian, largely due to the distance between the Sun and Mars compared to the Earth, and the inferred weaker Sun in the early solar system. Furthermore, a CO_{2}-H_{2}O greenhouse atmosphere to warm the climate should have left extensive deposits of carbonate rocks, which have not been found. Problems also exist with sustaining such an atmosphere for long enough to allow the valleys to form, as the unweathered basalts so prevalent on Mars should form extremely effective carbon sinks, especially if the surface is wet, and continuing impacts from space in Mars's early history should quickly strip any atmosphere away.

Solutions to this apparent contradiction may include exotic mechanisms that do not require a sustained CO_{2}-H_{2}O greenhouse, such as episodic heating due to volcanism or impacts. Other possibilities (other than misinterpretation of the geology and geomorphology) are defects in the physics of, or boundary conditions for, the climate models - a stronger Sun than current theory predicts, defective assumptions about trace (but powerful) greenhouse gases, or failings in the parameterization of CO_{2} clouds.

However, it is possible that additional trace gases, together with CO_{2}, could have solved this paradox. Ramirez et al.(2014) had shown that a CO_{2}-H_{2} greenhouse would be strong enough to produce the above-freezing temperatures necessary for valley formation. This CO_{2}-H_{2} greenhouse has been subsequently found to be even more effective than originally demonstrated in Ramirez et al. (2014), with warm solutions possible at hydrogen concentrations and CO_{2} pressures as low as 1% and 0.55 bar, respectively.
