= Thaumasia quadrangle =

Map of Mars

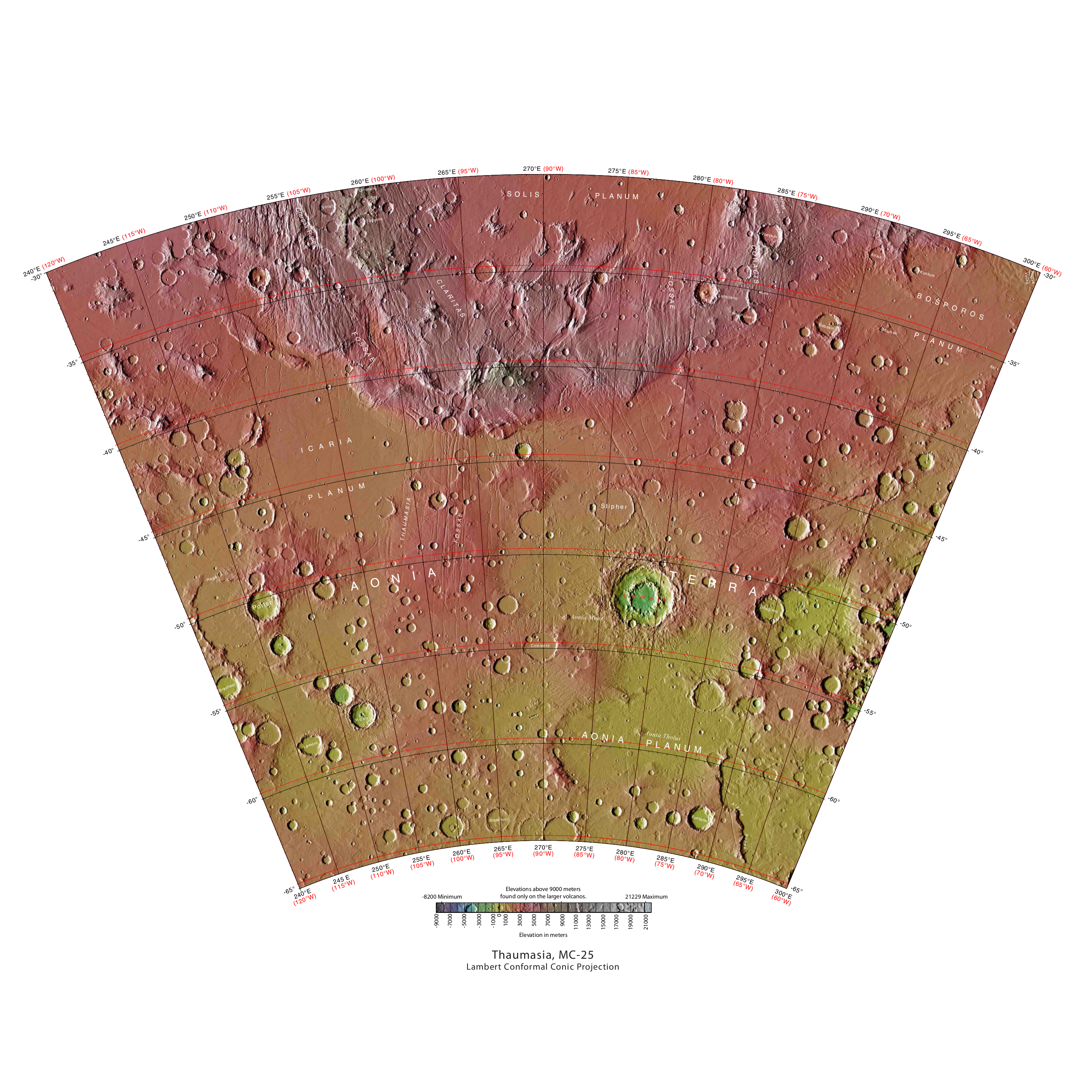
- Map of Thaumasia quadrangle from Mars Orbiter Laser Altimeter (MOLA) data. The highest elevations are red and the lowest are blue.
- Coordinates: 47.5°S 90°W

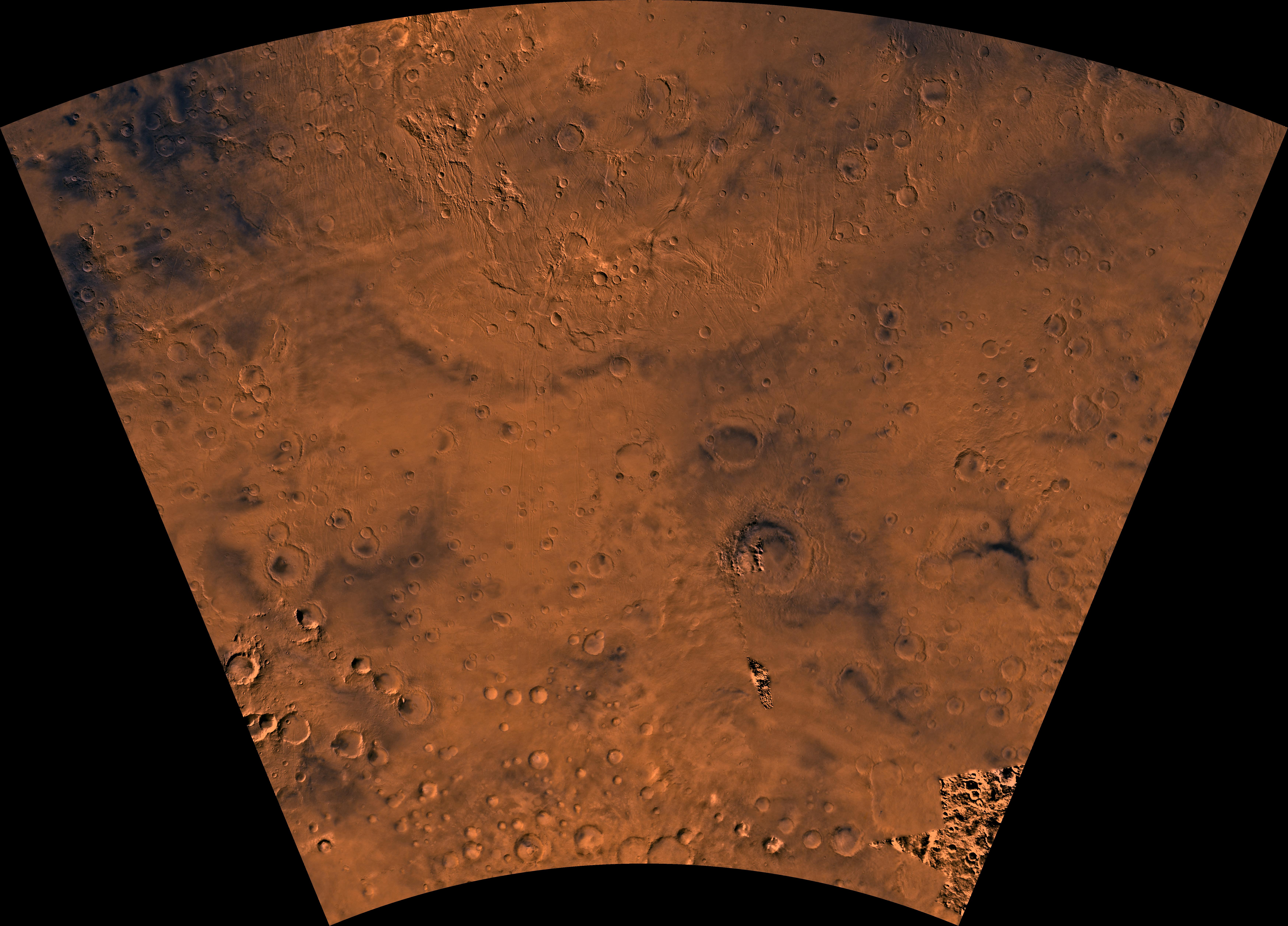
Image of the Thaumasia Quadrangle (MC-25). The northern part includes Thaumasia plateau. The southern part contains heavily cratered highland terrain and relatively smooth, low plains, such as Aonia Planum and Icaria Planum. Parts of Solis Planum, Aonia Terra, and Bosporus Planum are also found in this quadrangle. The east-central part includes Lowell Crater.

The Thaumasia quadrangle is one of a series of 30 quadrangle maps of Mars used by the United States Geological Survey (USGS) Astrogeology Research Program. The Thaumasia quadrangle is also referred to as MC-25 (Mars Chart-25). The name comes from Thaumas, Greek god of the clouds and celestial apparitions.

The Thaumasia quadrangle covers the area from 60° to 120° west longitude and 30° to 65° south latitude on Mars. The Thaumasia quadrangle contains many different regions or parts of many regions: Solis Planum, Icaria Planum, Aonia Terra, Aonia Planum, Bosporus Planum, and Thaumasia Planum. One of the first major networks of stream channels, called Warrego Valles, were discovered here by early orbiters. Another sign of water is the presence of gullies carved into steep slopes.

== Martian gullies ==
Gullies are common in some parts of Mars. Gullies occur on steep slopes, especially on the walls of craters. Martian gullies are believed to be relatively young because they have few, if any craters. Moreover, they lie on top of sand dunes which themselves are considered to be quite young. Usually, each gully has an alcove, channel, and apron. Some studies have found that gullies occur on slopes that face all directions, others have found that the greater number of gullies are found on poleward facing slopes, especially from 30-44 S.

Many ideas have been put forward to explain them; the most popular involve liquid water coming from an aquifer, from melting at the base of old glaciers, or from the melting of ice in the ground when the climate was warmer.

There is evidence for all three theories. Most of the gully alcove heads occur at the same level, just as one would expect of an aquifer. Various measurements and calculations show that liquid water could exist in aquifers at the usual depths where gullies begin. One variation of this model is that rising hot magma could have melted ice in the ground and caused water to flow in aquifers. Aquifers are layer that allow water to flow. They may consist of porous sandstone. The aquifer layer would be perched on top of another layer that prevents water from going down (in geological terms it would be called impermeable). Because water in an aquifer is prevented from going down, the only direction the trapped water can flow is horizontally. Eventually, water could flow out onto the surface when the aquifer reaches a break—like a crater wall. The resulting flow of water could erode the wall to create gullies. Aquifers are quite common on Earth. A good example is "Weeping Rock" in Zion National Park, Utah.

As for the next theory, much of the surface of Mars is covered by a thick smooth mantle that is thought to be a mixture of ice and dust. This ice-rich mantle, a few yards thick, smooths the land, but in places it has a bumpy texture, resembling the surface of a basketball. The mantle may be like a glacier and under certain conditions the ice that is mixed in the mantle could melt and flow down the slopes and make gullies. Because there are few craters on this mantle, the mantle is relatively young. An excellent view of this mantle is shown below in the picture of the Ptolemaeus Crater Rim, as seen by HiRISE.

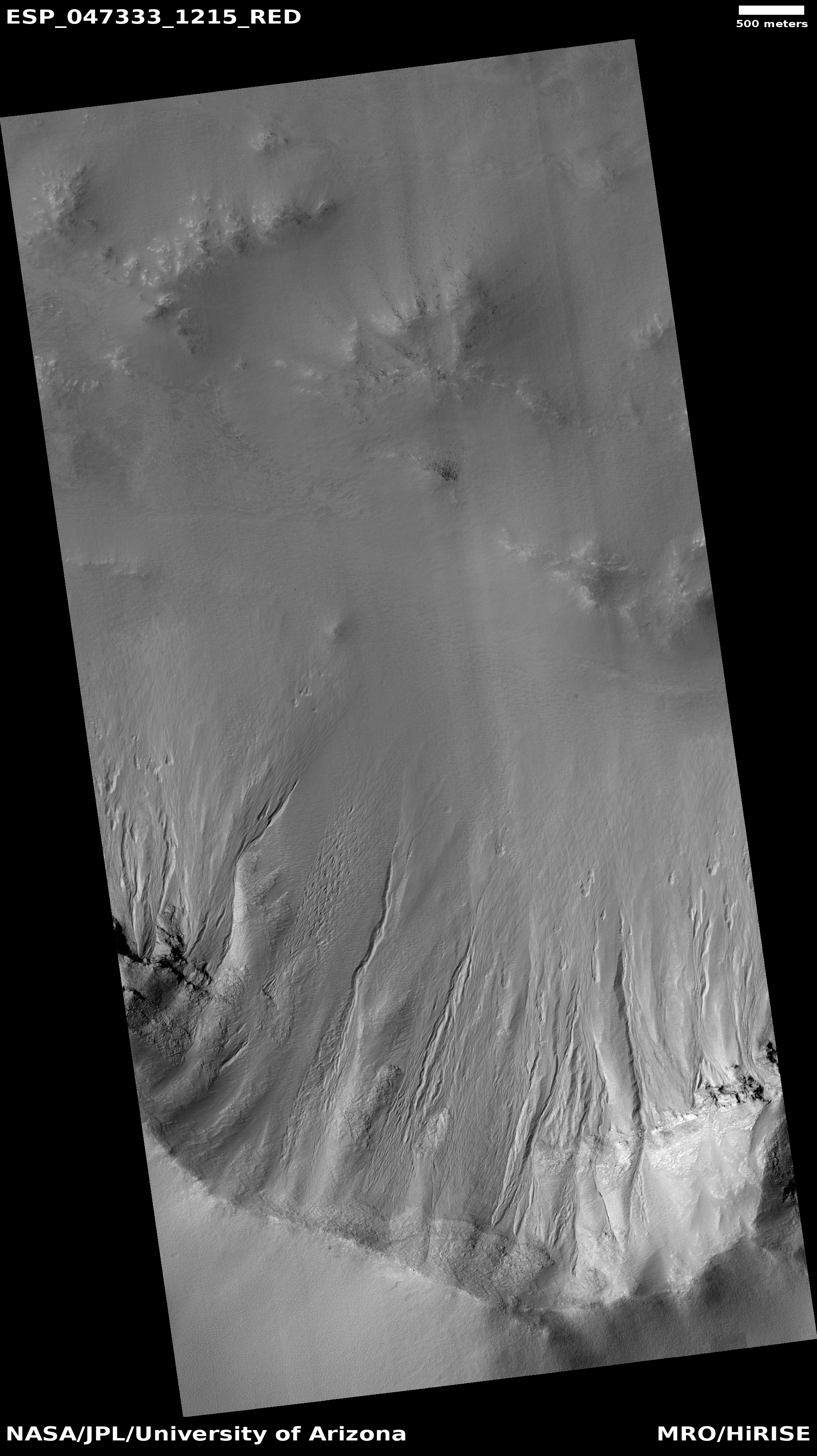
Wide view of gullies in Ross Crater, as seen by HiRISE under HiWish program

The ice-rich mantle may be the result of climate changes. Changes in Mars's orbit and tilt cause significant changes in the distribution of water ice from polar regions down to latitudes equivalent to Texas. During certain climate periods water vapor leaves polar ice and enters the atmosphere. The water comes back to ground at lower latitudes as deposits of frost or snow mixed generously with dust. The atmosphere of Mars contains a great deal of fine dust particles. Water vapor will condense on the particles, then fall down to the ground due to the additional weight of the water coating. When Mars is at its greatest tilt or obliquity, up to 2 cm of ice could be removed from the summer ice cap and deposited at midlatitudes. This movement of water could last for several thousand years and create a snow layer of up to around 10 meters thick. When ice at the top of the mantling layer goes back into the atmosphere, it leaves behind dust, which insulating the remaining ice. Measurements of altitudes and slopes of gullies support the idea that snowpacks or glaciers are associated with gullies. Steeper slopes have more shade which would preserve snow.

Higher elevations have far fewer gullies because ice would tend to sublimate more in the thin air of the higher altitude. Very few gullies are found in the Thaumasia region; however, a few are present in the lower elevations like the one pictured below in Ross Crater.

The third theory might be possible since climate changes may be enough to simply allow ice in the ground to melt and thus form the gullies. During a warmer climate, the first few meters of ground could thaw and produce a "debris flow" similar to those on the dry and cold Greenland east coast. Since the gullies occur on steep slopes only a small decrease of the shear strength of the soil particles is needed to begin the flow. Small amounts of liquid water from melted ground ice could be enough. Calculations show that a third of a mm of runoff can be produced each day for 50 days of each Martian year, even under current conditions.

== Sand dunes ==
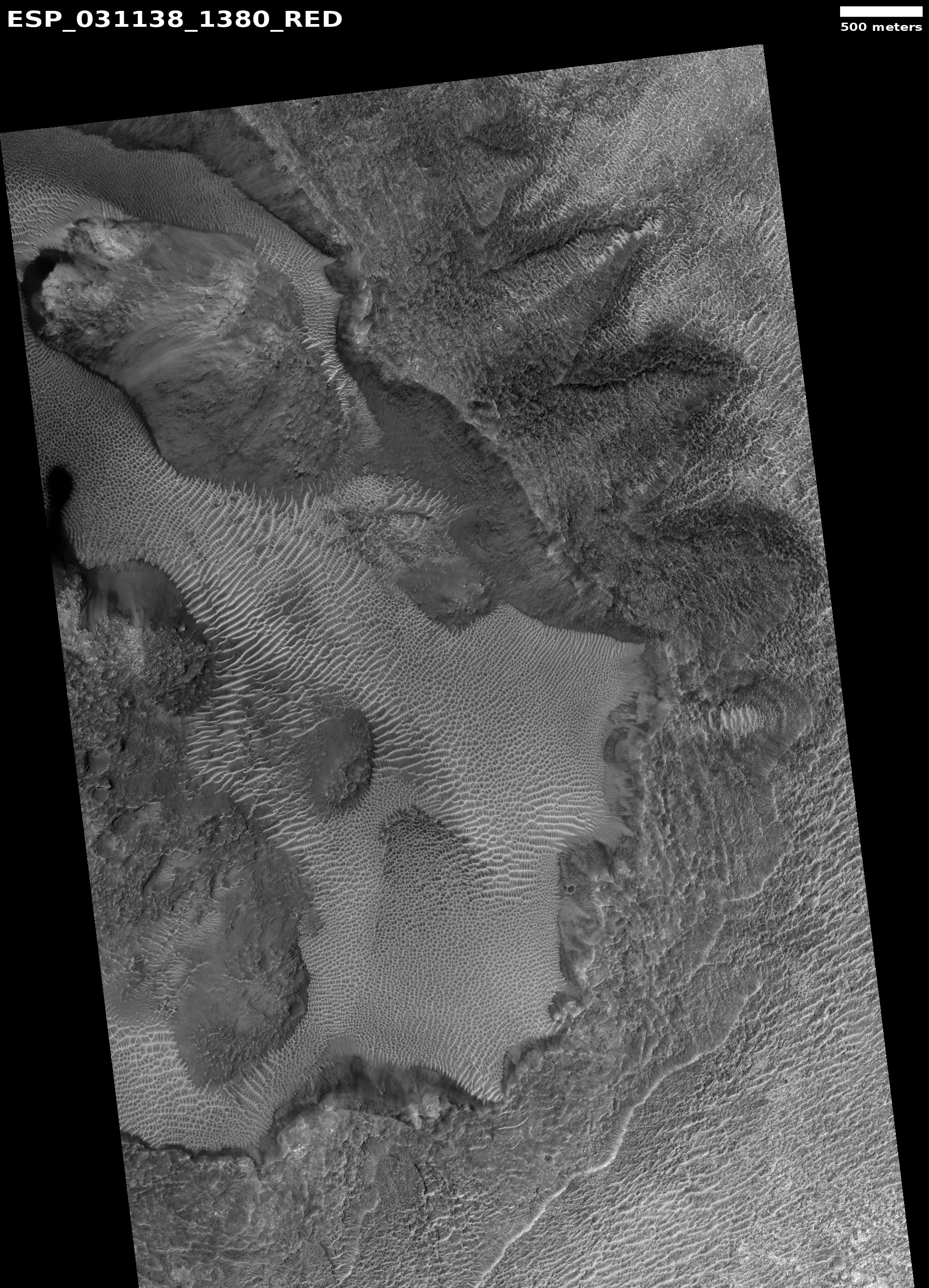
Wide view of field of intersecting dunes, as seen by HiRISE under HiWish program

Many places on Mars have sand dunes. Some craters in Thaumasia show dark blotches in them. High resolution photos show that the dark markings are dark sand dunes. Dark sand dunes probably contain the igneous rock basalt. Brashear Crater, pictured below, is one crater with dark dunes.

== Warrego Valles ==
Mariner 9 and Viking Orbiter images, showed a network of branching valleys in Thaumasia called Warrego Valles. These networks are evidence that Mars may have once been warmer, wetter, and perhaps had precipitation in the form of rain or snow. A study with the Mars Orbiter Laser Altimeter, Thermal Emission Imaging System (THEMIS) and the Mars Orbiter Camera (MOC) support the idea that Warrego Valles was formed from precipitation. At first glance they resemble river valleys on Earth. But sharper images from more advanced cameras reveal that the valleys are not continuous. They are very old and may have suffered from the effects of erosion. A picture below shows some of these branching valleys.

== Craters ==
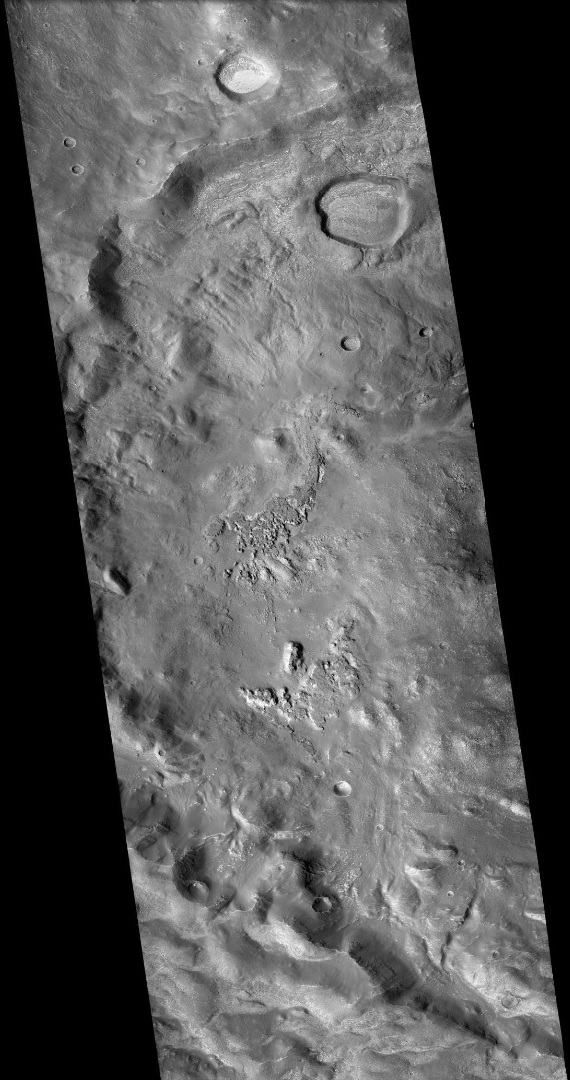
Lampland Crater, as seen by CTX camera (on Mars Reconnaissance Orbiter)

The density of impact craters is used to determine the surface ages of Mars and other solar system bodies. The older the surface, the more craters present. Crater shapes can reveal the presence of ground ice.

The area around craters may be rich in minerals. On Mars, heat from the impact melts ice in the ground. Water from the melting ice dissolves minerals, and then deposits them in cracks or faults that were produced with the impact. This process, called hydrothermal alteration, is a major way in which ore deposits are produced. The area around Martian craters may be rich in useful ores for the future colonization of Mars. Studies on the earth have documented that cracks are produced and that secondary minerals veins are deposited in the cracks. Images from satellites orbiting Mars have detected cracks near impact craters. Great amounts of heat are produced during impacts. The area around a large impact may take hundreds of thousands of years to cool. Many craters once contained lakes. Because some crater floors show deltas, we know that water had to be present for some time. Dozens of deltas have been spotted on Mars. Deltas form when sediment is washed in from a stream entering a quiet body of water. It takes a bit of time to form a delta, so the presence of a delta is exciting; it means water was there for a time, maybe for many years. Primitive organisms may have developed in such lakes; hence, some craters may be prime targets for the search for evidence of life on the Red Planet.

== Channels ==
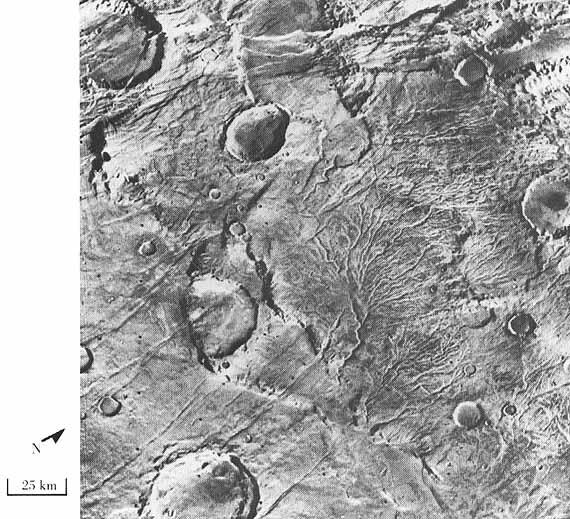
Branched channels in Thaumasia quadrangle, as seen by Viking Orbiter.

There is enormous evidence that water once flowed in river valleys on Mars. Images of curved channels have been seen in images from Mars spacecraft dating back to the early 1970s with the Mariner 9 orbiter. Indeed, a study published in June 2017, calculated that the volume of water needed to carve all the channels on Mars was even larger than the proposed ocean that the planet may have had. Water was probably recycled many times from the ocean to rainfall around Mars.

== See also ==
- Climate of Mars
- Dunes
- HiRISE
- HiWish program
- Impact crater
- list of quadrangles on Mars
- Martian Gullies
- Valley network (Mars)
- Vallis
- Water on Mars

MC-01 Mare Boreum (features)
MC-02 Diacria (features)		MC-03 Arcadia (features)	MC-04 Acidalium (features)	MC-05 Ismenius Lacus (features)		MC-06 Casius (features)	MC-07 Cebrenia (features)
MC-08 Amazonis (features)	MC-09 Tharsis (features)	MC-10 Lunae Palus (features)	MC-11 Oxia Palus (features)	MC-12 Arabia (features)	MC-13 Syrtis Major (features)	MC-14 Amenthes (features)	MC-15 Elysium (features)
MC-16 Memnonia (features)	MC-17 Phoenicis Lacus (features)	MC-18 Coprates (features)	MC-19 Margaritifer Sinus (features)	MC-20 Sinus Sabaeus (features)	MC-21 Iapygia (features)	MC-22 Mare Tyrrhenum (features)	MC-23 Aeolis (features)
MC-24 Phaethontis (features)		MC-25 Thaumasia (features)	MC-26 Argyre (features)	MC-27 Noachis (features)		MC-28 Hellas (features)	MC-29 Eridania (features)
MC-30 Mare Australe (features)
