= Argentea Planum =

Plateau on Mars

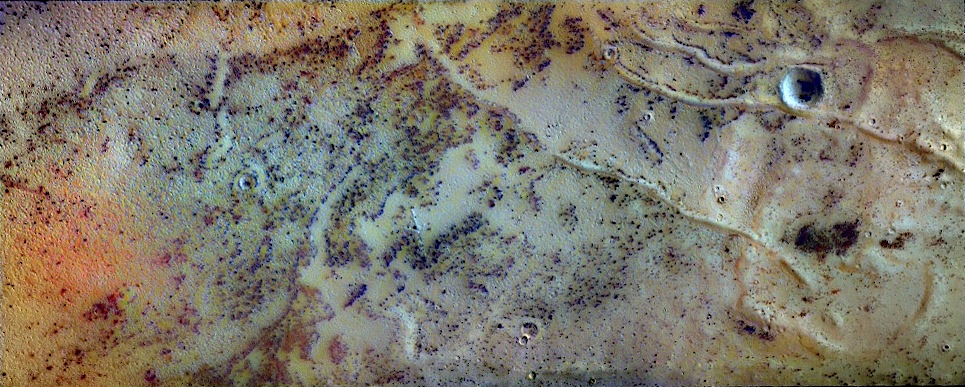
- Aregntea Planum, as seen by a NASA probe
- Feature type: Plateau
- Diameter: 1,370 km

The Argentea Planum is a plateau on the surface of Mars, located with the planetocentric coordinate system at -63.86 north latitude and 337.89° east longitude, measuring 1,370.64 km in diameter. The name was approved by the International Astronomical Union in 2003 and refers to one of the albedo characteristics on Mars.

== See also ==
- List of plains on Mars
