= List of plains on Mars =

This is a list of plains on Mars. Such features are named after the nearest classical albedo feature in compliance with the International Astronomical Union's rules of planetary nomenclature. Plains may be named denoted "planitia" or "planum", depending on height.

== Planitia ==
Planitia (plural: planitiae) is Latin for plain. It is the IAU descriptor term for features which are "low plains".

Name	Coordinates	Size (km)
Acidalia Planitia	50°N 21°W	3400
Amazonis Planitia	26°N 163°W	2800
Arcadia Planitia	47°N 176°W	1900
Argyre Planitia	50°S 43°W	900
Chryse Planitia	29°N 40°W	1500
Elysium Planitia	3°N 155°E	3000
Eridania Planitia	38°S 122°E	1100
Hellas Planitia	42.5°S 70.5°E	2300
Isidis Planitia	14°N 88°E	1200
Utopia Planitia	47°N 118°E	3600

== Plana ==
Planum (plural: plana) is the Latin word for plateau. It is the IAU descriptor term for plateaus and high plains.

Name	Latitude	Longitude	Diameter (km)
Aeolis Planum	0.79 S	145.0 E	820
Amenthes Planum	3.16 N	105.7 E	960
Aonia Planum	57.71 S	281.0 E	650
Argentea Planum	69.79 S	292.0 E	1750
Ascuris Planum	40.38 N	279.2 E	500
Aurorae Planum	10.38 S	310.8 E	600
Bosporus Planum	34.2 S	295.1 E	700
Daedalia Planum	21.78 S	232.0 E	1800
Hesperia Planum	22.27 S	110.0 E	1700
Icaria Planum	43.18 S	253.5 E	650
Lucus Planum	3.96 S	182.0 E	864
Lunae Planum	10.38 N	294.0 E	1800
Malea Planum	64.75 S	65.0 E	900
Meridiani Planum	0.2 N	357.5 E	1100
Nepenthes Planum	12.46 N	113.4 E	1660
Oenotria Plana	8 S	76 E	925
Olympia Planum	81.91 N	195.0 E	1000
Ophir Planum	8.7 S	302.5 E	650
Oxia Planum	18.275 N	335.368 E	
Parva Planum	75.85 S	257.0 E	750
Planum Angustum	79.69 S	276.5 E	200
Planum Australe	83.93 S	160.0 E	1450
Planum Boreum	87.98 N	15.0 E	1100
Planum Chronium	59.72 S	140.0 E	550
Promethei Planum	78.88 S	90.0 E	850
Sinai Planum	13.35 S	272.0 E	900
Sisyphi Planum	69.79 S	5.0 E	1100
Solis Planum	25.25 S	273.5 E	1700
Syria Planum	13.06 S	256.1 E	740
Syrtis Major Planum	8.41 N	69.5 E	1350
Thaumasia Planum	24.45 S	295.7 E	650
Zephyria Planum	0.99 S	153.1 E	550
