= Groundwater sapping =

Geomorphic erosion process

Groundwater sapping is a geomorphic erosion process that results in the headward migration of channels in response to near constant fluid discharge at a fixed point. The consistent flow of water displaces fine sediments which physically and chemically weathers rocks. Valleys that appear to have been created by groundwater sapping occur throughout the world in areas such as England, Colorado, Hawai’i, New Zealand, and many other places. However, it is difficult to characterize a landform as being formed exclusively by groundwater sapping due to phenomena such as pluvial runoff, plunge-pool undercutting, changes in water table level, and inconsistent groundwater flow. An example of drainage ways created purely by the outflow of subsurface fluids can be seen on the foreshores of beaches. As the surge of water and sand brought to land by a wave retreats seaward, the film of water becomes thinner until it forms rhomboid shaped patterns in the sand. Small fans form at the apex of the rhombic features, which are eventually fed by the remaining backflow of water traveling downslope. Channels begin to form headward in the form of millimeter wide rills along the sides of the fans; the creation of these small channel networks culminates when the last of the backwash dissipates.

This is one of the processes involved in the formation of gullies, such as lavaka. Erosion by sapping tends to produce steep-sided U-shaped valleys of fairly uniform width with box-like, "theater-shaped" headwalls. This contrasts with the more common branching or dendritic pattern of V-shaped valleys produced by overland flows that become wider with distance from their source. Groundwater sapping has been suggested as the cause for erosion of the valley and channel networks on Mars, although studies show that groundwater alone can not excavate and transport the material required to create these canyons.

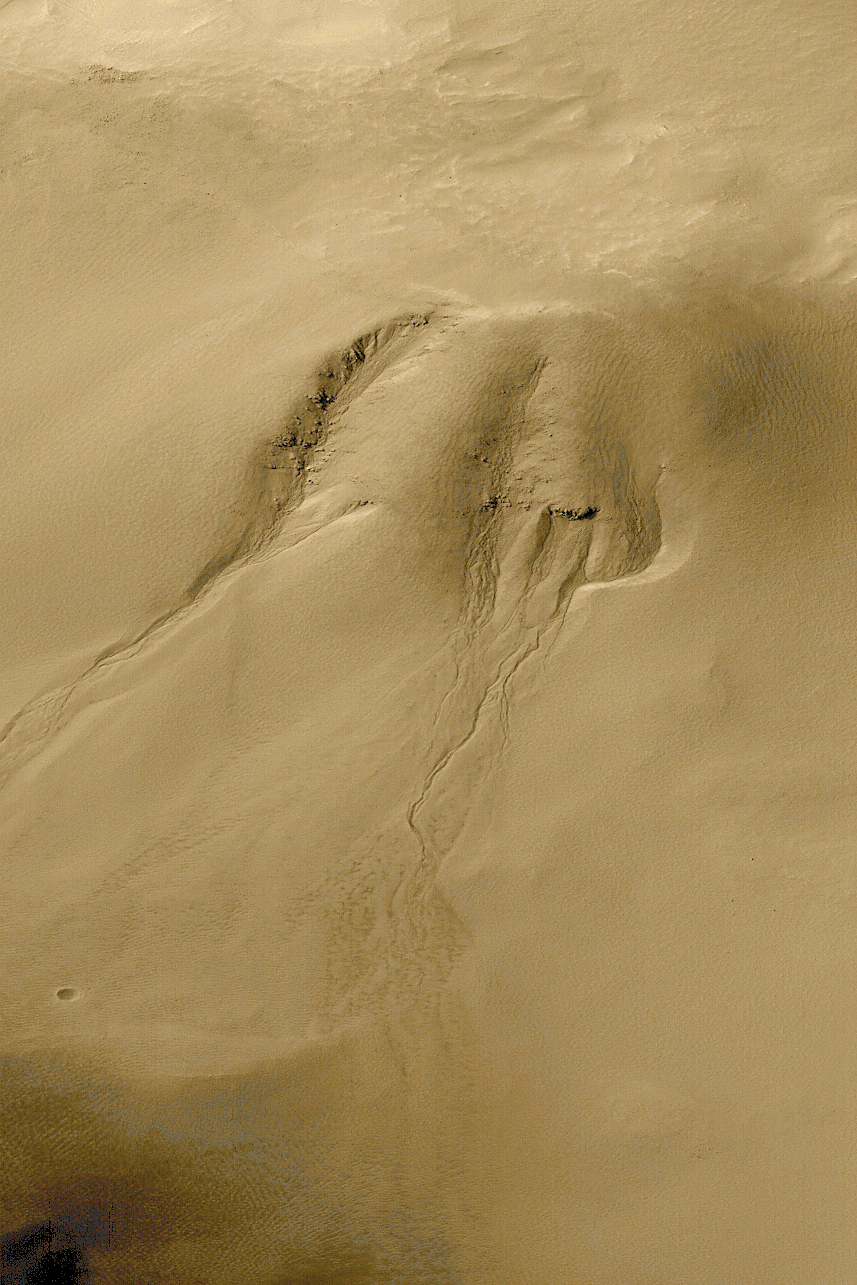
Scientists believe that groundwater sapping created these gullies in Noachis Terra on Mars. NASA image.

== Geomorphology and geology ==
Sapping typically occurs in permeable sandstones associated with high water tables underlain by an impermeable layer. Limited in its ability to travel vertically, water is forced to travel laterally where it eventually seeps out of the ground. Limestones, siltstones, and shales can be found in valleys created by groundwater sapping as well.

== Characteristic landforms ==
Characteristic landforms caused by groundwater sapping are “theater-shaped” channel heads and “U-shaped” valleys, which have a consistent width and steep valley walls. Weakened basal rocks are unable to support more resistant upper layers, causing valley head and sidewalls to collapse inwards. Theater-shaped channel heads are characterized by overhanging sidewalls that are relatively dry compared to the lower level rocks below the zone of seepage. The development of theater heads has been related to “ground-water flow direction, jointing and faulting, permeability contrasts, formation slope and dip angles, and formation cohesion”. The morphology of channels and valleys created by sapping are highly dependent on regional scale geology, and can be hard to distinguish from features created through alternative processes. Chemical precipitates can be used as indicators of groundwater water discharge implying that a valley or channel may have been formed as a result of sapping. These sorts of clues are important in areas where water is not currently being discharged.

== Notable landmarks ==
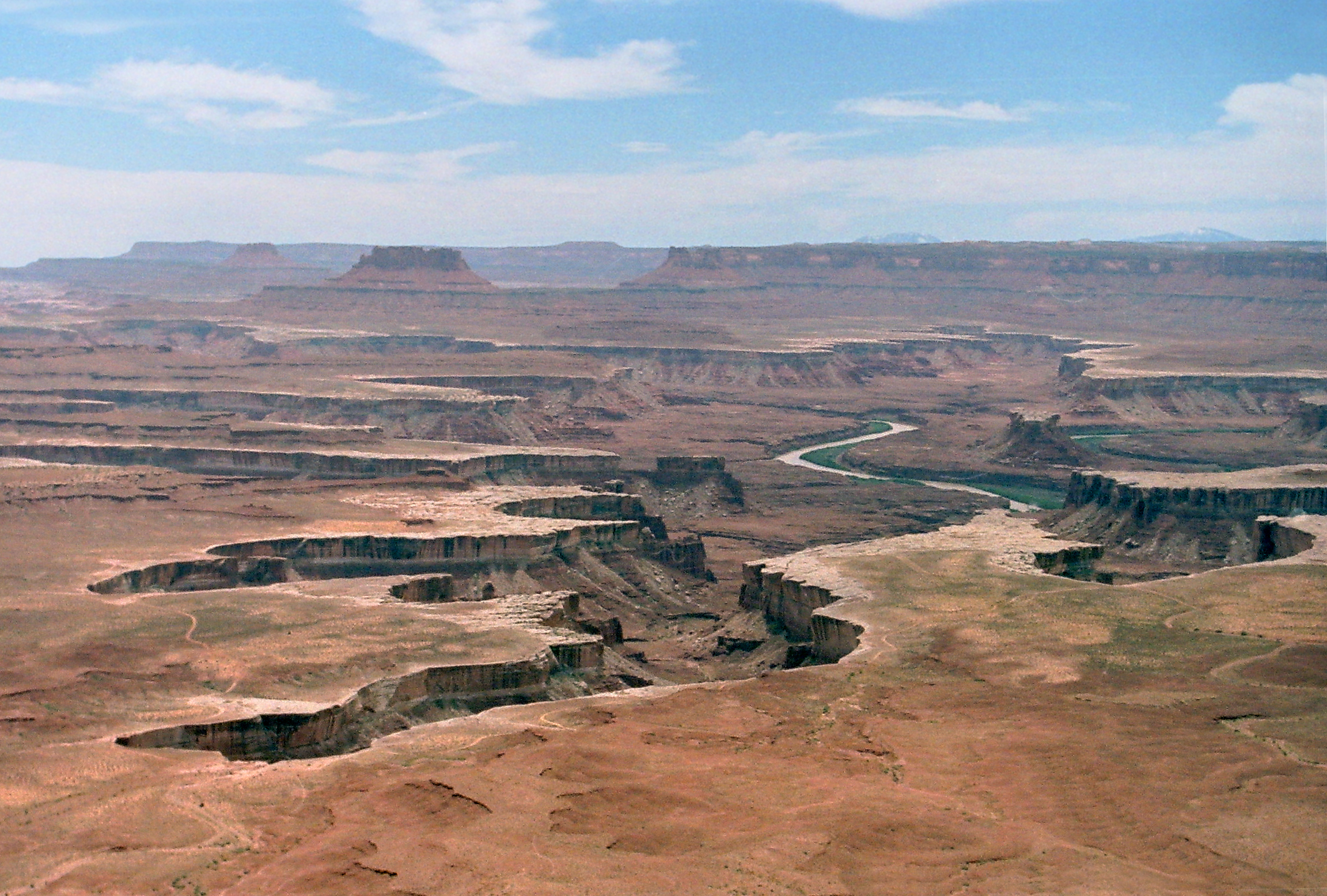
The two canyons at center-left in this photo from Canyonlands National Park in Utah have the theater-shaped heads typical of valley features shaped by groundwater sapping. The Green River is at right.

=== Colorado Plateau ===
Many “natural amphitheaters” can be found near the Colorado River. It is thought that sapping may have been more common in this area in the past when there was a higher water table. A shift in the climate and associated precipitation or the incision of the Colorado River are two factors that may have caused a change in the water table level.

=== Mars ===
Short, stream-like, deep channels have been observed on Mars. Very similar to valleys created by groundwater sapping here on Earth, the discovery of the Martian valleys has prompted numerous studies that aim to better understand the process of sapping.

== See also ==
- Headward erosion
- Groundwater discharge
- Valley networks (Mars)
