= Icaria Planum =

Planum on Mars

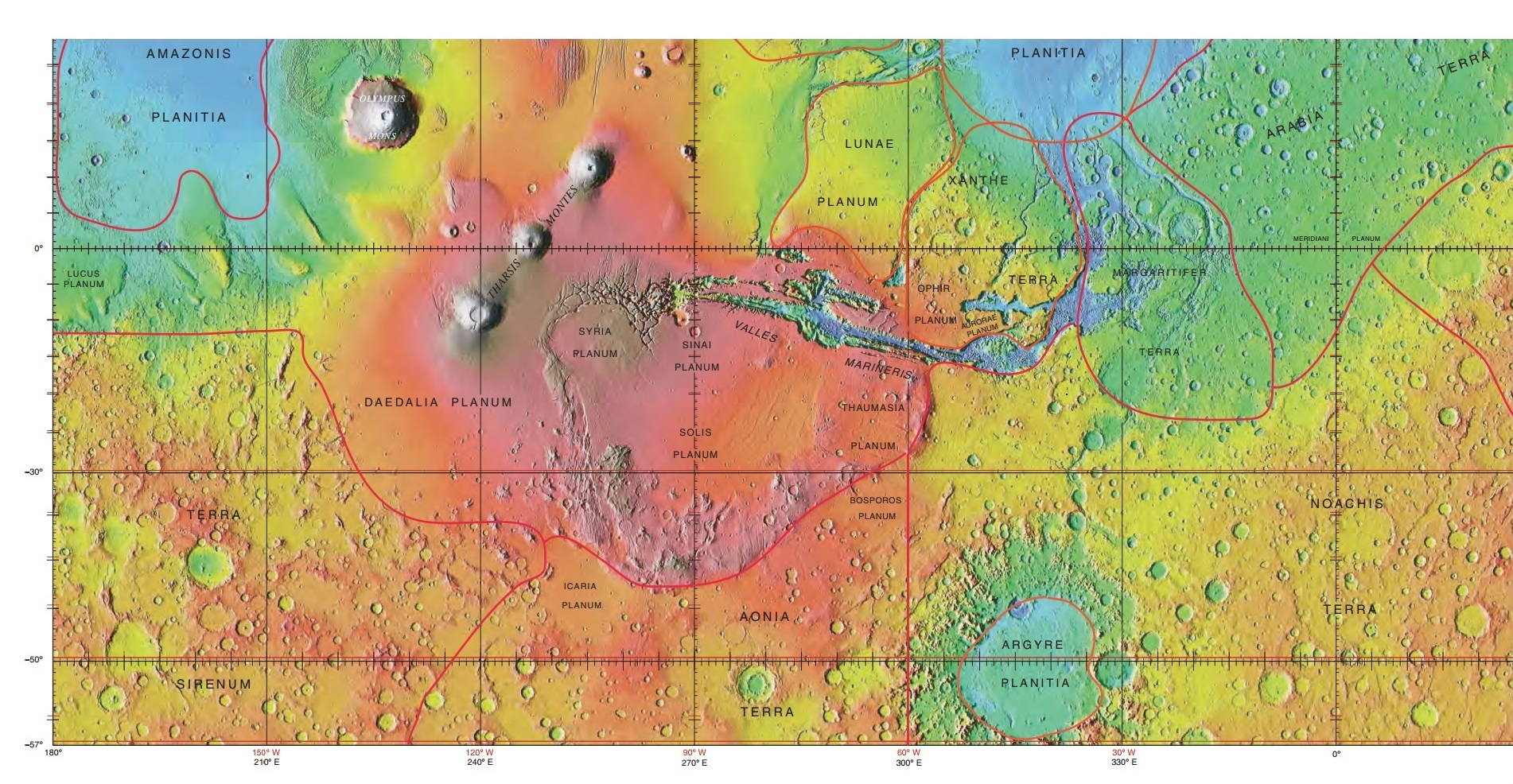
- MOLA colorized relief map showing boundaries of Icaria Planum and other regions
- Feature type: Region
- Location: Thaumasia quadrangle, Mars
- Coordinates: 39°40′S 130°00′W
- Eponym: Ikaria

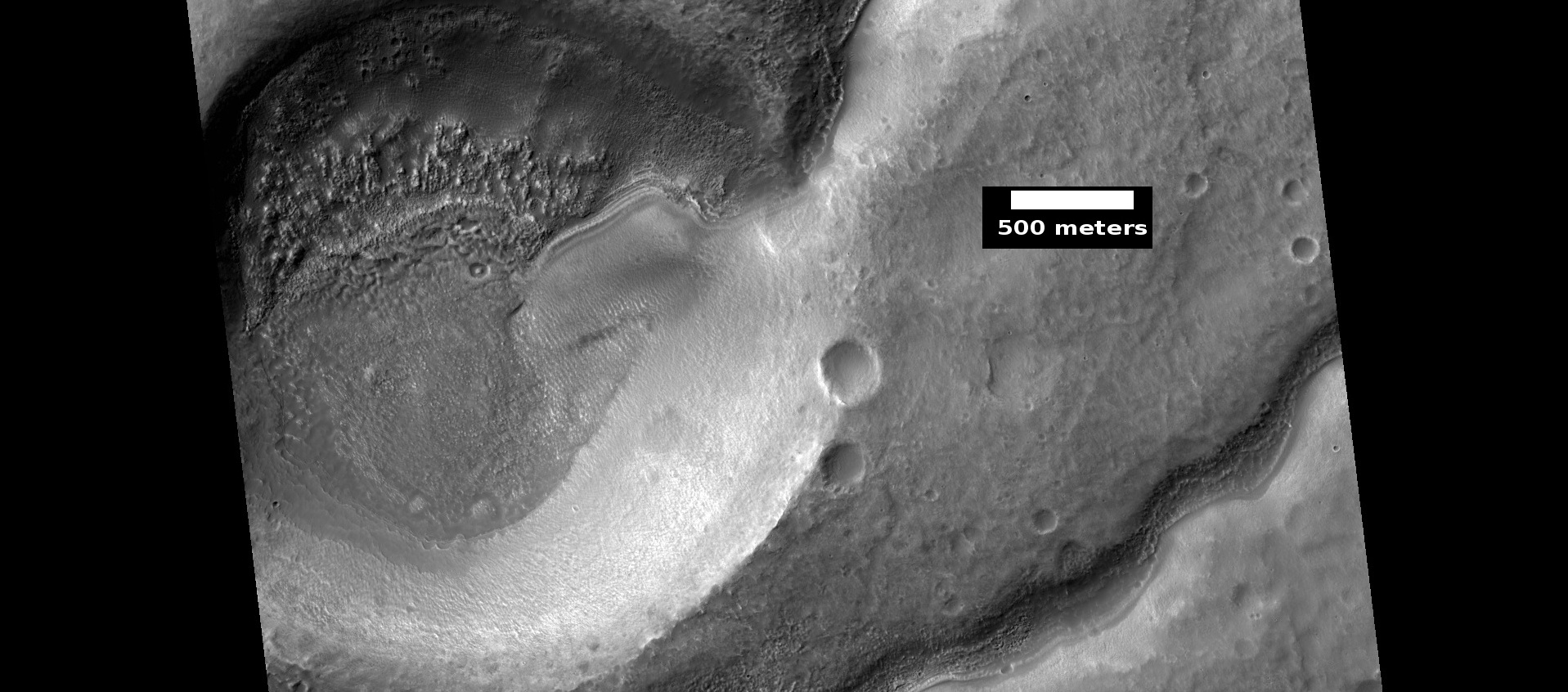
Crater and one of many nearby channels, as seen by HiRISE under HiWish program. Picture is from Icaria Planum.

Icaria Planum is a region on Mars in the Thaumasia quadrangle. It is located roughly south-southwest of the Tharsis Rise. Icaria Planum is named after the island of Ikaria, where, according to Greek mythology, Icarus fell and died in the sea.

Icaria Planum is relatively ancient and cratered, with an estimated age of 3.59 billion years. Some subsequent volcanic resurfacing occurred ~0.94 billion years ago, in the Middle Amazonian period. Icaria Planum hosts numerous wrinkle ridges, a class of compressional faults thought to have formed from stresses in the Martian crust. The wrinkle ridges in Icaria Planum formed roughly 3.46 billion years ago and are largely concentric to the Tharsis Rise, likely due to the immense weight of the emplaced volcanic material as Tharsis formed. Icaria Planum hosts an alluvial fan, likely due to the breach of an ancient paleolake from an impact crater close to the nearby Claritas Fossae.

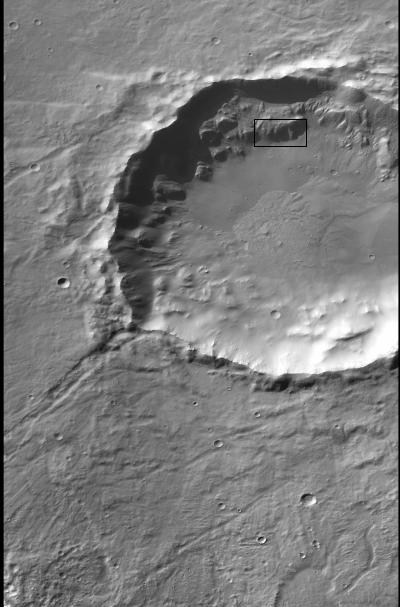
CTX image from Icaria Planum that shows location of next image.

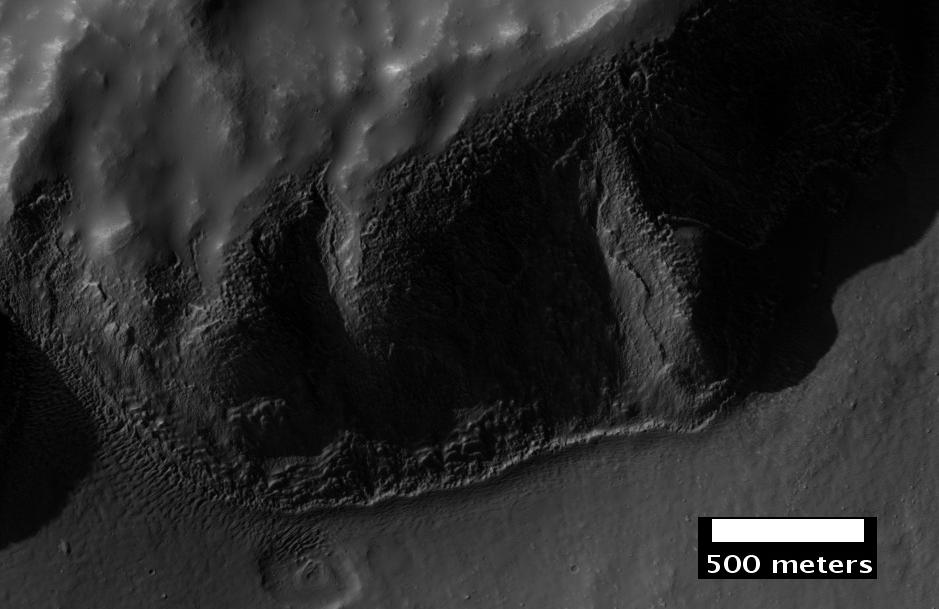
Layers in mantle deposit, as seen by HiRISE, under the HiWish program. Mantle was probably formed from snow and dust falling during a different climate.

== See also ==
- HiRISE
- HiWish program
- Latitude dependent mantle
- Thaumasia quadrangle
