= Bosporos Planum =

Planum on Mars

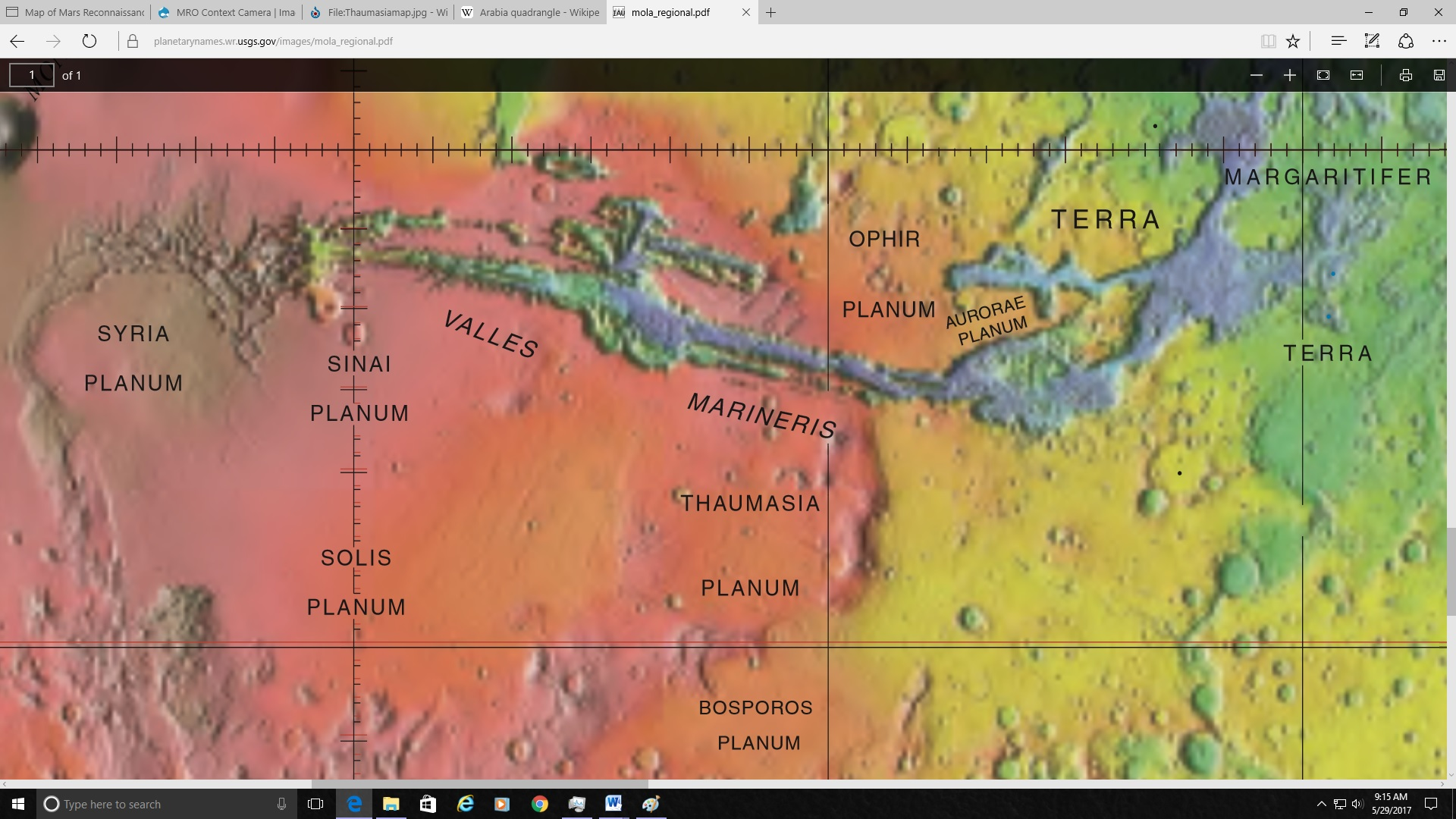
- Map of the midwestern part of Mars with Bosporos Planum shown at the bottom
- Feature type: Plateau
- Location: Thaumasia quadrangle (majority)
- Coordinates: 33.87°S 64.49°E
- Length: 730
- Discoverer: Mariner 9
- Eponym: Bosphorus Strait

Bosporos Planum is a high plateau (planum) located in the Thaumasia quadrangle in the Southern Hemisphere of Mars. It is about 730 km long stretching from southwest to northeast. Previously named Erythraeum Planum, it was renamed to its current name in 1979. Its name derives from one of the classical albedo features observed by early astronomers, named after the Bosphorus Strait.
