= Classical albedo features on Mars =

Early attempts at describing the surface of Mars

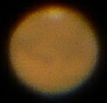
Mars, as seen through a small telescope in 2003, showing the patterns of brightness and color known as albedo features.

The classical albedo features of Mars are the light and dark features that can be seen on the planet Mars through an Earth-based telescope. Before the age of space probes, several astronomers created maps of Mars on which they gave names to the features they could see. The most popular system of nomenclature was devised by Giovanni Schiaparelli, who used names from classical antiquity. Today, the improved understanding of Mars enabled by space probes has rendered many of the classical names obsolete for the purposes of cartography; however, some of the old names are still used to describe geographical features on the planet.

== History ==
=== Observing albedo features ===
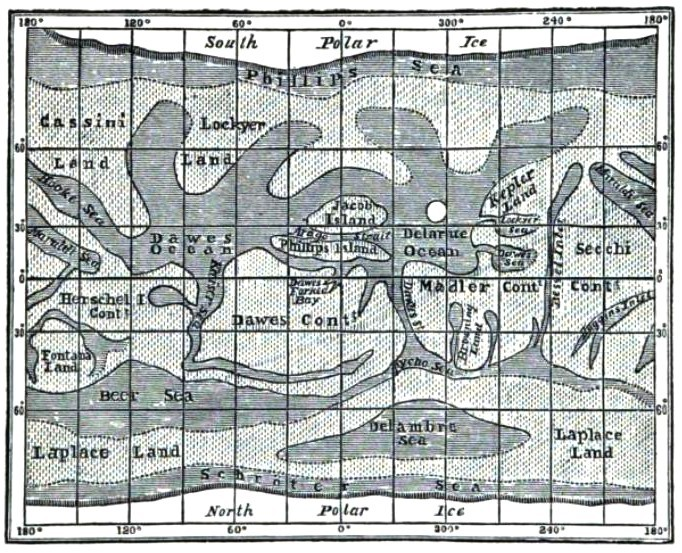
Richard A. Proctor's map of Mars, which named albedo features after astronomers. North is at the bottom, as seen through an inverting telescope.

Early telescopic astronomers, observing Mars from a great distance through primitive instruments (though they were advanced for their day), were limited to studying albedo contrasts on the surface of the planet. These lighter and darker patches rarely correspond to topographic features and in many cases obscure them. The origins of the albedo contrasts were a mystery. The lighter patches at the poles were correctly believed to be a frozen substance, either water or carbon dioxide, but the nature of the dark patches seen against the general reddish tint of Mars was uncertain for centuries. When Giovanni Schiaparelli began observing Mars in 1877, he believed that the darker features were seas, lakes, and swamps and named them accordingly in Latin (mare, lacus, palus etc.). Within a few decades, however, most astronomers came to agree that Mars lacks large bodies of surface water. The dark features were then thought by some to be indications of Martian vegetation, since they changed shape and intensity over the course of the Martian year. They are now known to be areas where the wind has swept away the paler dust, exposing a darker surface, often basaltic rock; so their borders change in response to windstorms on the Martian surface that move the dust around, widening or narrowing the features.

The dust-storms themselves also appear as light patches, can cover vast areas and sometimes last for many weeks; when Mariner 9 arrived in Martian orbit in November 1971 the entire planet was covered by a single enormous dust-storm, with only the peaks of the four or five highest mountains showing above it. This variability may explain many of the differences between telescopic observations over the years.

=== Early non-classical names ===
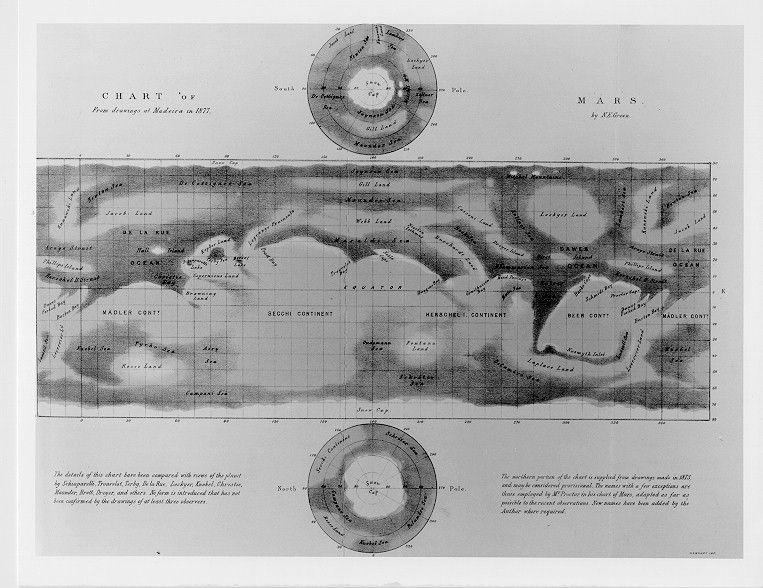
Nathaniel Green's 1877 Mars map, which used many of Proctor's names. North is at the bottom.

The first map of Martian albedo features was published in 1840 by Johann Heinrich Mädler and Wilhelm Beer, but they simply labelled the features a, b, c ... without giving them names. Over the next two decades the most prominent features picked up various informal names (such as the Hourglass Sea for what is now Syrtis Major Planum) but there was no overall system.

The first astronomer to name Martian albedo features systematically was Richard A. Proctor, who in 1867 created a map (based in part on the observations of William Rutter Dawes) in which several features were given the names of astronomers who had been involved in mapping Mars. In some cases, the same names were used for multiple features. Proctor's names remained in use for several decades, notably in several early maps drawn by Camille Flammarion in 1876 and Nathaniel Green in 1877.

=== Schiaparelli's classical names ===
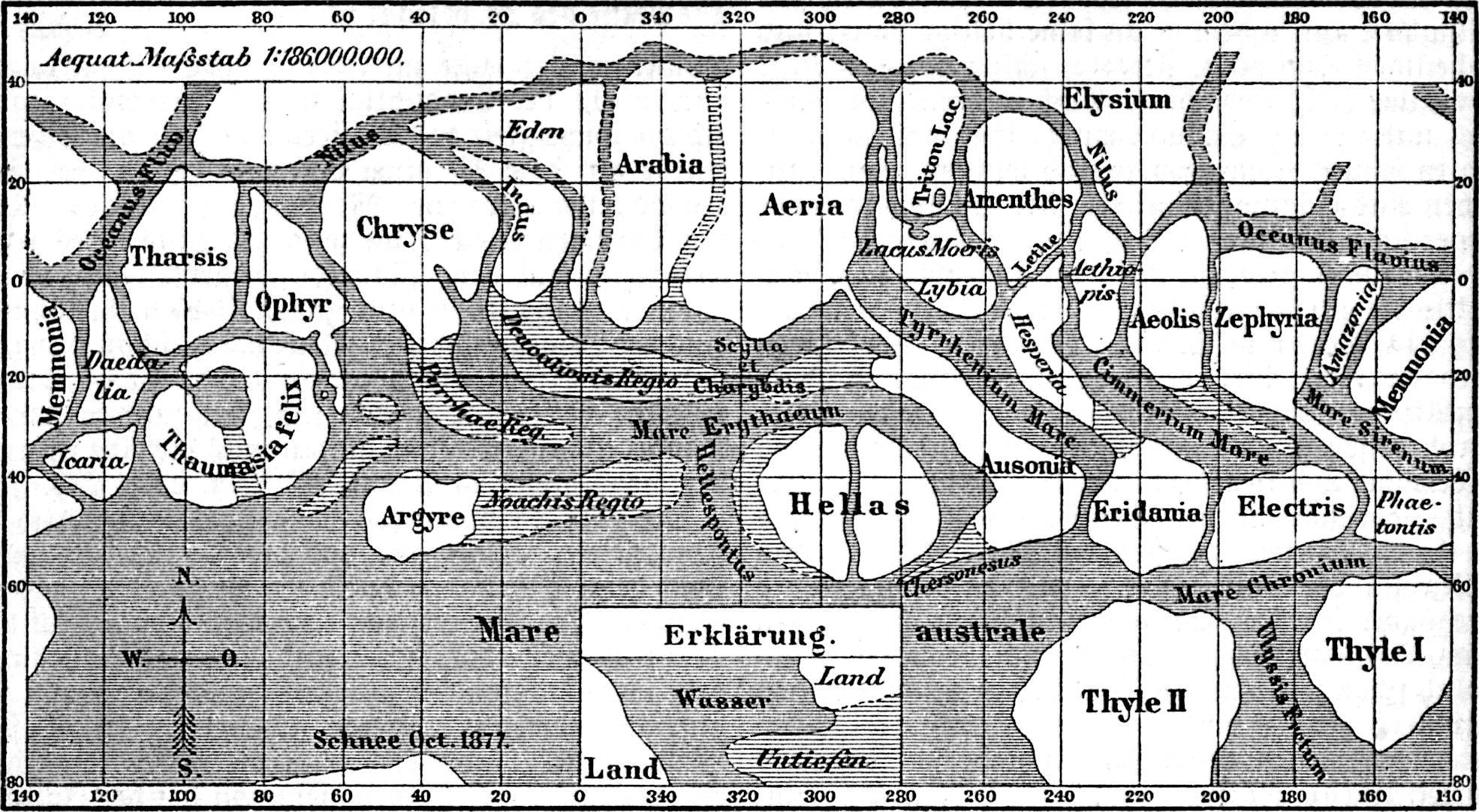
Early Schiaparelli map, from an 1888 encyclopedia.

However, within a few decades Proctor's names were superseded by a new scheme devised by Giovanni Schiaparelli, whose observations differed from Proctor's, and who used this difference to justify drawing up an entirely new system of nomenclature. Schiaparelli was an expert on ancient astronomy and geography, and used Latin names, drawn from the myths, history and geography of classical antiquity; dark features were named after ancient seas and rivers, light areas after islands and legendary lands.

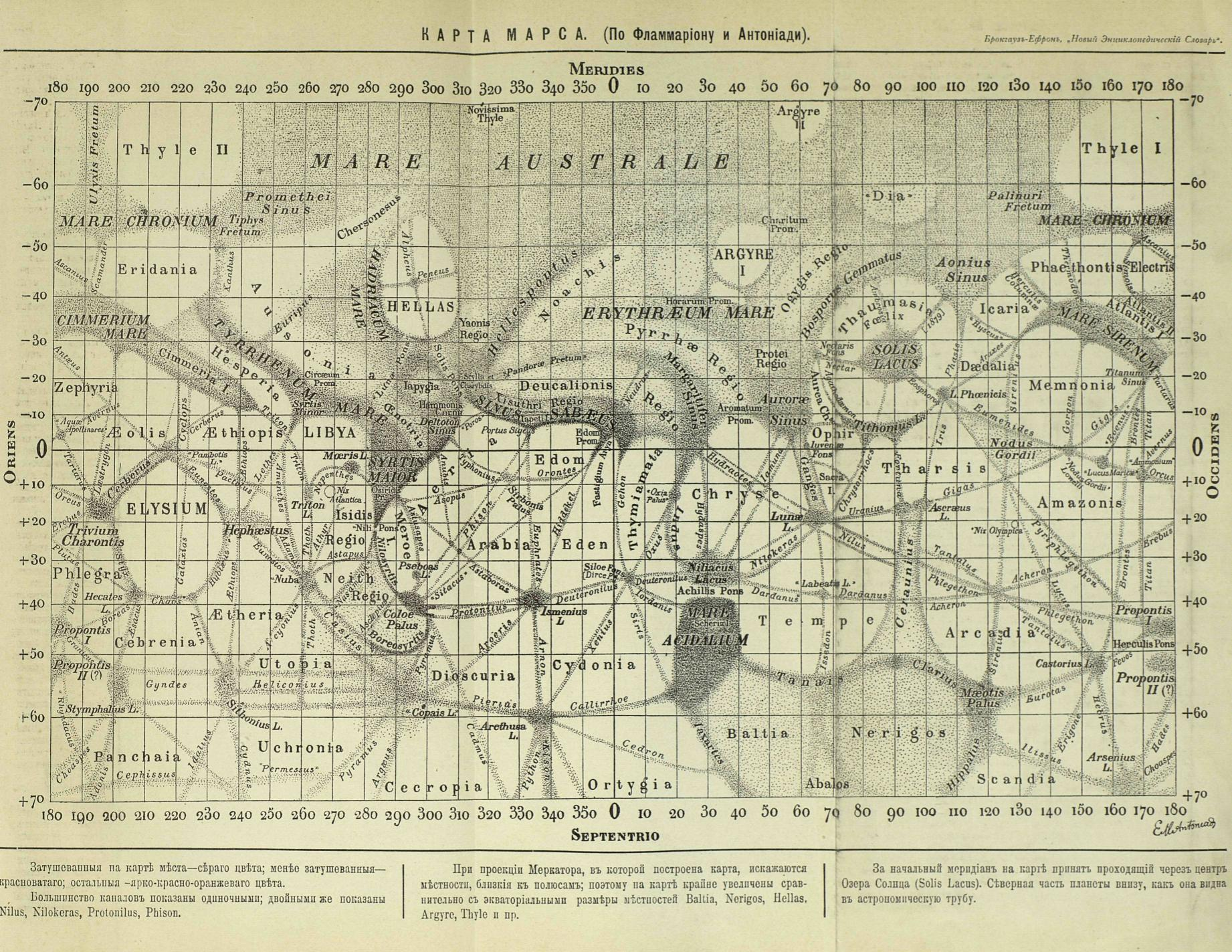
Early map by Flammarion and Antoniadi. North is at the bottom.

When E. M. Antoniadi took over as the leading telescopic observer of Mars in the early 20th century, he followed Schiaparelli's names rather than Proctor's, and the Proctorian names quickly became obsolete. In his encyclopedic work La Planète Mars (1930) Antoniadi used all Schiaparelli's names and added more of his own from the same classical sources. However, there was still no 'official' system of names for Martian features.

In 1958, the International Astronomical Union set up an ad hoc committee under Audouin Dollfus, which settled on a list of 128 officially recognised albedo features. Of these, 105 came from Schiaparelli, 2 from Flammarion, 2 from Percival Lowell, and 16 from Antoniadi, with an additional 3 from the committee itself. This involved a considerable amount of pruning; Antoniadi's La Planète Mars had mentioned 558 named features.

The pictures returned by interplanetary spacecraft, notably the observations made from Martian orbit by Mariner 9 over the course of 1972, have revolutionized the scientific understanding of Mars, and some of the classical albedo features have become obsolete as they do not correspond clearly with the detailed images provided by the spacecraft. However, many of the names used for topographic features on Mars are still based on the classical nomenclature for the feature's location; for instance, the albedo feature 'Ascraeus Lacus' provides the basis of the name of the volcano Ascraeus Mons in roughly the same position.

In addition, since most Earth-based amateur telescopes are not powerful enough to resolve the topographic surface features of Mars, amateur astronomers still use many of the old feature-names to orient themselves and record their observations.

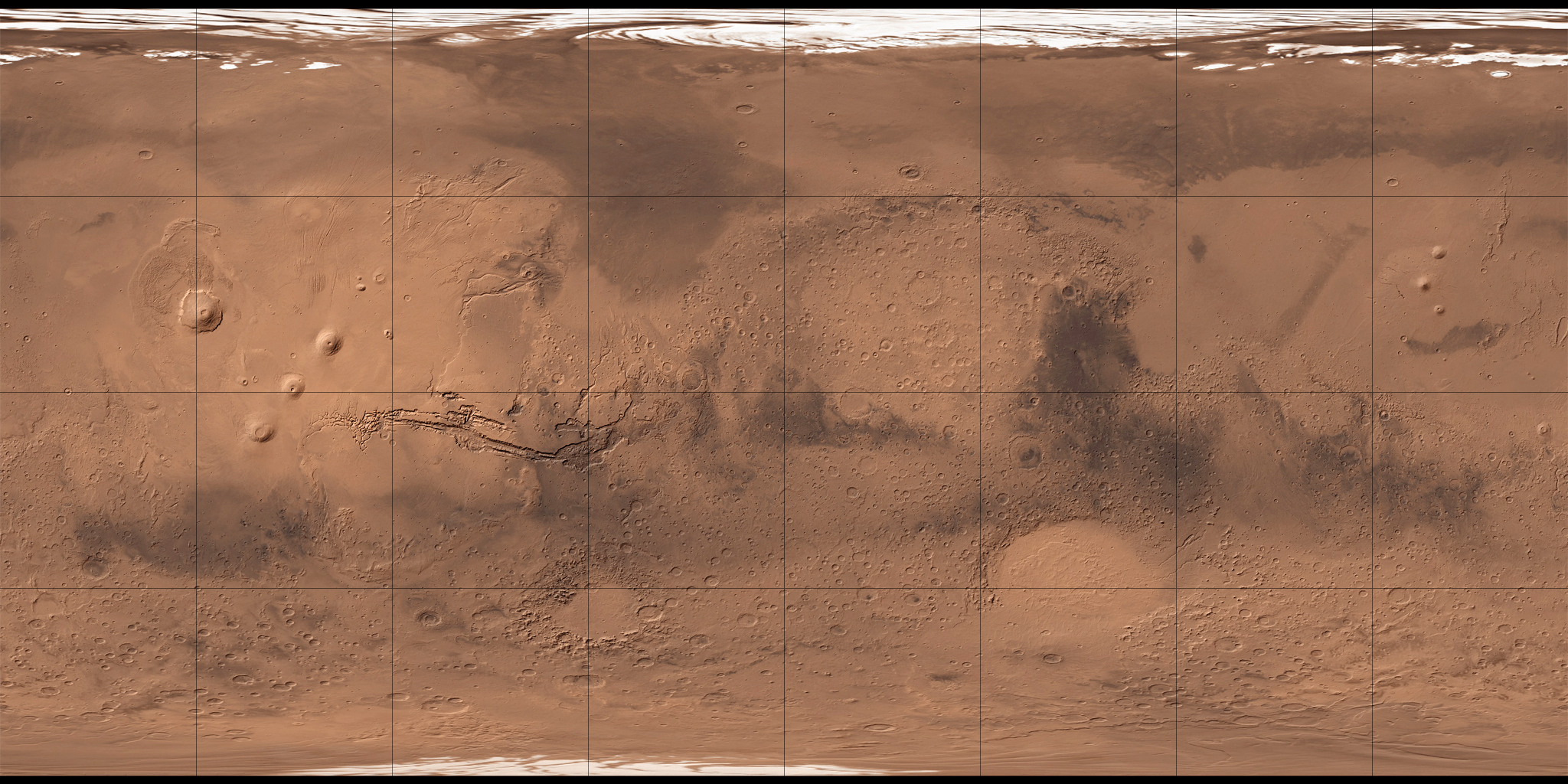

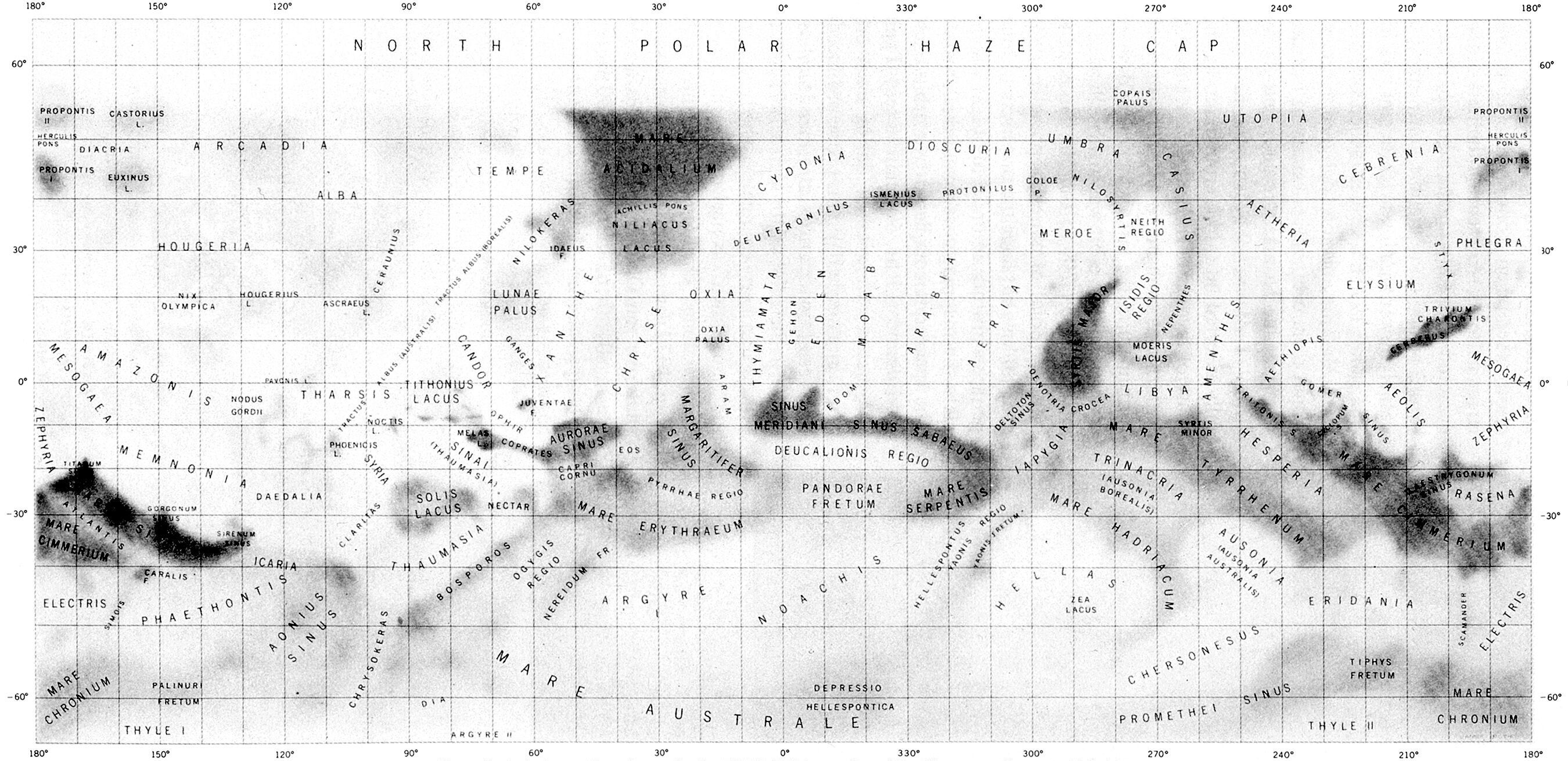
Mars albedo features after the 1958 official list of names, but before the 1972 observations of Mariner 9.

== Common feature names ==
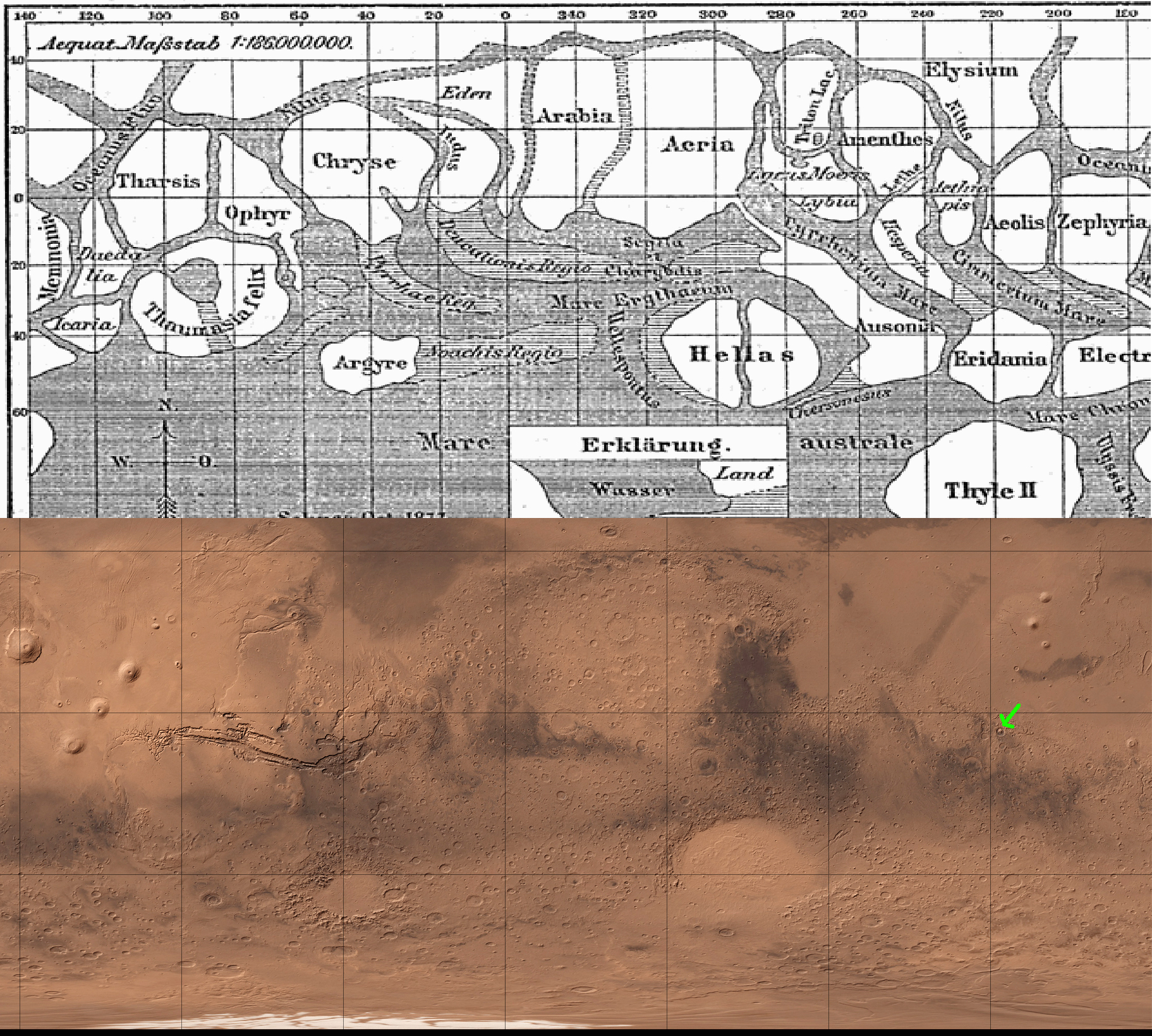
Classical albedo features on Mars, whose names date back to Schiaparelli (1888 map above), share some boundaries with more recent satellite observations.

Several Latin words involved here are common nouns. These are generally, but not always, second in the name, but are usually ignored in alphabetizing below:

- Campi (/ˈkæmpaɪ/) – fields
- Cherso (/ˈkɜːrsoʊ/) – peninsula
- Cornu (/ˈkɔːrnjuː/) – horn, peninsula
- Depressio (/dɪˈprɛʃioʊ/) – lowland
- Fastigium (/fæsˈtɪdʒiəm/) – summit
- Fons (/ˈfɒnz/) – fountain
- Fretum (/ˈfriːtəm/) – strait
- Insula (/ˈɪnsjʊlə/) – island
- Lacus (/ˈleɪkəs/) – lake
- Lucus (/ˈljuːkəs/) – grove
- Mare (/ˈmɑːreɪ, ˈmɛəriː/) – sea
- Nix (/ˈnɪks/) – snow
- Palus (/ˈpeɪləs/) – marsh
- Pons (/ˈpɒnz/) – bridge
- Promontorium (/ˌprɒmənˈtɔːriəm/) – cape
- Regio (/ˈriːdʒioʊ/) – region
- Silva (/ˈsɪlvə/) – wood
- Sinus (/ˈsaɪnəs/) – bay

== List of albedo features ==
Not listed here are the "canals" also observed and named by Schiaparelli, for which see the articles Martian canals and List of Martian canals.

Note that the pronunciation refers to English pronunciation, not Latin or Italian.

=== A ===
| Name | Pronunciation | Meaning | Modern name(s) |
|---|---|---|---|
| Abalos | /ˈæbəlɒs/ | A no-longer existent island in the North Sea, east of Heligoland | Abalos Colles, Abalos Mensa, Abalos Scopuli, Abalos Undae |
| Achæorum Portus | /ˌækiːˈɔːrəm ˈpɔːrtəs/ | "Harbor of the Achaeans" | —N/a |
| Acherusia Palus | /ˌækɪˈruːʒiə ˈpeɪləs/ | "Marsh of Acherusia", named after the legendary swamps in Greek mythology | —N/a |
| Achillis Pons | /əˈkɪlɪs ˈpɒnz/ | "Bridge of Achilles" | —N/a |
| Mare Acidalium | /ˈmɛəriː ˌæsɪˈdeɪliəm/ | "Sea of Acidalia", named for the fountain Acidalia where the Graces bathed | Acidalia Colles, Acidalia Mensa, Acidalia Planitia |
| Æolis | /ˈiːəlɪs/ | a modification of Aeolia, the name of the floating western island of Aiolos, the ruler of the winds | Aeolis Mensae, Aeolis Planum |
| Aëria | /eɪˈɪəriə/ | From a poetic name for Egypt | Aeria, IAU recognized albedo feature |
| Ætheria | /ɪˈθɪəriə/ | – the land of the living, as referred to in Virgil's Aeneid | Aetheria, IAU recognized albedo feature |
| Æthiopis | /ɪˈθaɪəpɪs/ | Land of the Ethiopians | Aethiopis, IAU recognized albedo feature |
| Aganippe Fons | /ˌæɡəˈnɪpiː ˈfɒnz/ | "Aganippe's Fountain", legendary home of a Greek naiad | Aganippe Fossa |
| Alcyonia | /ˌælsiˈoʊniə/ | Land of kingfishers. | —N/a |
| Amazonis | /əˈmæzənɪs/ | "Land of the Amazon", legendary warrior women | Amazonis Mensa, Amazonis Planitia, Amazonis Sulci |
| Amenthes | /əˈmɛnθiːz/ | Alternate name for Duat, the Egyptian land of the dead | Amenthes Cavi, Amenthes Fossae, Amenthes Planum, Amenthes Rupes |
| Ammonium | /əˈmoʊniəm/ | Ancient name for the Siwa Oasis | —N/a |
| Mare Amphitrites | /ˈmɛəriː ˌæmfɪˈtraɪtiːz/ | "Sea of Amphitrite", a Greek sea-goddess | Amphitrites Patera |
| Lucus Angitiæ | /ˈljuːkəs ænˈdʒɪʃɪiː/ | "Grove of Angitia", named after the snake goddess | —N/a |
| Depressiones Aoniæ | /dɪˌprɛʃiˈoʊniːz eɪˈoʊnɪiː/ | "Lowlands of the Muses", who came from Helicon in Aonia | —N/a |
| Aonius Sinus | /eɪˈoʊniəs ˈsaɪnəs/ | "Bay of the Muses" | Aonia Mons, Aonia Planum, Aonia Terra, Aonia Tholus |
| Aponi Fons | /ˈæpənaɪ ˈfɒnz/ | Roman name for the Bagni d'Abano, warm-water baths near Padua | —N/a |
| Aquæ Apollinares | /ˈeɪkwiː əˌpɒlɪˈnɛəriːz/ | "Apollo's Waters"; Roman name for the Bagni di Stigliano baths in Canale Monterano, Tuscany | —N/a |
| Aquæ Calidæ | /ˈeɪkwiː ˈkælɪdiː/ | "Hot spring" | —N/a |
| Aquarii Depressio | /əˈkwɛəriaɪ dɪˈprɛʃioʊ/ | "Lowland of Aquarius" | —N/a |
| Arabia | /əˈreɪbiə/ | Arabian Peninsula | Arabia Terra |
| Arachoti Fons | /ˌærəˈkoʊtaɪ ˈfɒnz/ | "Fountain of Arachotus", a river in Afghanistan | —N/a |
| Aram | /ˈɛərəm/ | Aram, Biblical land of the Aramaeans | Aram Chaos |
| Arcadia | /ɑːrˈkeɪdiə/ | From Arcadia, a region of the central Peloponnesus | Arcadia Chaos, Arcadia Dorsa, Arcadia Planitia |
| Arduenna | /ˌɑːrdjuˈɛnə/ | Latin names for the Ardennes forests | —N/a |
| Arethusa Fons | /ˌærɪˈθjuːzə ˈfɒnz/ | "Arethusa's Fountain", after the Greek nymph | —N/a |
| Argyre I | /ˈɑːrdʒəriː ˈpraɪmə/ | One of a pair of legendary islands, Chryse and Argyre, located in the Indian Ocean and said to be made of gold and silver | Argyre Cavi, Argyre Planitia, Argyre Rupes, Argyre quadrangle |
| Argyre II | /ˈɑːrdʒəriː sɪˈkʌndə/ | "Second Silver Land" (see above) | —N/a |
| Argyroporos | /ˌɑːrdʒɪˈrɒpərɒs/ | "Silver Strait" | —N/a |
| Ariadnes Depressio | /ˌæriˈædniːz dɪˈprɛʃioʊ/ | "Lowland of Ariadne", a Greek heroine | Ariadnes Colles |
| Aromatum Promontorium | /əˈrɒmətəm ˌprɒmənˈtɔːriəm/ | "Cape of Fragrant Spices" | Aromatum Chaos |
| Arsia Silva | /ˈɑːrʃiə ˈsɪlvə/ | Arsia Silva, forest northwest of Rome where the Tarquinii were defeated | Arsia Chasmata, Arsia Mons, Arsia Sulci |
| Arsinoës Depressio | /ɑːrˈsɪnoʊiːz dɪˈprɛʃioʊ/ | Lowland of Arsinoë, the name of various Greek and Egyptian figures | Arsinoes Chaos |
| Artynia Fons | /ɑːrˈtɪniə fɒnz/ | "Artynia's Fountain", referring to Lake Artynia in Asia Minor | Artynia Catena |
| Aryn Promontorium | /ˈɛərɪn ˌprɒmənˈtɔːriəm/ | "Cape of Aryn" | —N/a |
| Fastigium Aryn | /fæsˈtɪdʒiəm ˈɛərɪn/ | "Summit of Aryn" | —N/a |
| Ascræus Lacus | /æˈskriːəs ˈleɪkəs/ | "Ascraeus Lake", a poetic paraphrase of "heliconian" or "rural" | Ascraeus Chasmata, Ascraeus Mons, Ascraeus Sulci |
| Astræ Lacus | /ˈæstriː ˈleɪkəs/ | "Lake of the Astra", Greek star-gods | —N/a |
| Atalantes Depressio | /ætəˈlæntiːz dɪˈprɛʃioʊ/ | Lowland of Atalanta, Greek heroine | —N/a |
| Nix Atlantica | /ˈnɪks ætˈlæntɪkə/ | "Snows of Atlas", a Titan in Greek mythology | —N/a |
| Atlantidum Sinus | /ætˈlæntɪdəm ˈsaɪnəs/ | "Bay of the Atlantises" (just south of Atlantis I and II, see below) | —N/a |
| Atlantis I | /ætˈlæntɪs ˈpraɪmə/ | "First Atlantis", mythical drowned land | Atlantis Chaos |
| Atlantis II | /ætˈlæntɪs sɪˈkʌndə/ | "Second Atlantis" (see above) | Atlantis Chaos |
| Augila | /ˈɔːdʒələ/ | Awjila, a city in Cyrenaica | —N/a |
| Aurea Cherso | /ˈɔːriːə ˈkɜːrsoʊ/ | "Golden Peninsula", ancient name for the Malay Peninsula | —N/a |
| Aureum Cornu | /ˈɔːriːəm ˈkɔːrnjuː/ | "Golden Horn", inlet dividing Constantinople | Aureum Chaos |
| Auroræ Sinus | /ɔːˈrɔːriː ˈsaɪnəs/ | "Bay of the Dawn" | Aurorae Planum, Aurorae Chaos |
| Ausonia | /ɔːˈzoʊniə/ | From a poetic name for Italy | Ausonia Cavus, Ausonia Mensa, Ausonia Montes |
| Mare Australe | /ˈmɛəriː ɒsˈtreɪliː/ | "Southern Sea" | Chasma Australe, Australe Lingula, Australe Mensa, Australe Montes, Planum Australe, Australe Scopuli, Australe Sulci, Mare Australe quadrangle |

=== B-E ===
| Name | Pronunciation | Meaning | Modern name(s) |
|---|---|---|---|
| Baltia | /ˈbælʃiə/ | From a name for the regions near the Baltic Sea | Baltia, IAU recognized albedo feature |
| Bandusiæ Fons | /bænˈdjuːʒɪiː ˈfɒnz/ | "Fountain of Bandusia", title of a poem by Horace | —N/a |
| Bathys Portus | /ˈbeɪθɪs ˈpɔːrtəs/ | "Deep Harbor", the port of Aulis in Boeotia | Bathys Planum, changed to Icaria Planum |
| Benacus Lacus | /bɪˈneɪkəs ˈleɪkəs/ | "Lake Benacus" (Lago di Garda in northern Italy) | —N/a |
| Biblis Fons | /ˈbɪblɪs ˈfɒnz/ | "Biblis Fountain", a Carian well near Miletus | Biblis Patera, Biblis Tholus |
| Bosporium Promontorium | /bɒsˈpɔːriəm ˌprɒmənˈtɔːriəm/ | "Cape of the Bosphorus" | |
| Bosporus/Bosphorus Gemmatus | /ˈbɒspərəs, ˈbɒsfərəs dʒɪˈmeɪtəs/ | "Bejewelled Bosphorus" | Bosporos Planum, Bosporus Regio, Bosporos Rupes |
| Brangæna | /brænˈdʒiːnə/ | | —N/a |
| Capri | | "Isle of Capri" | Capri Chasma, Capri Mensa |
| Casius | | Mt Casius in Egypt, famous in antiquity for the nearby coastal marshes in which whole armies were reputed to have drowned | Casius quadrangle |
| Castalia Fons | /kæsˈteɪliə fɒnz/ | "Castalian Springs" | |
| Cebrenia | /sɪˈbriːniə/ | Land of Cebrenia near Troy | Cebrenia quadrangle |
| Cecropia | /sɪˈkroʊpiə/ | "Land of Cecrops" | |
| Ceraunius | /sɪˈrɔːniəs/ | | Ceraunius Catena, Ceraunius Fossae |
| Chalce | /ˈkælsiː/ | | Chalce Montes |
| Charitum Promontorium | /ˈkærɪtəm ˌprɒmənˈtɔːriəm/ | "Cape of the Graces" | Charitum Montes |
| Chironis Fretum | /kaɪˈroʊnɪs ˈfriːtəm/ | "Strait of Chiron" | |
| Mare Chronium | /ˈmɛəriː ˈkroʊniəm/ | | Planum Chronium, Chronius Mons |
| Chryse | /ˈkraɪsiː/ | One of a pair of legendary islands, Chryse and Argyre, located in the Indian Ocean and said to be made of gold and silver | Chryse Chaos, Chryse Colles, Chryse Planitia |
| Chrysokeras | /krɪˈsɒkərəs/ | The Golden Horn | |
| Cimmeria Insula | /sɪˈmɪəriə ˈɪnsjʊlə/ | "Cimmerian Island" | —N/a |
| Mare Cimmerium | /ˈmɛəriː sɪˈmɪəriəm/ | "Cimmerian Sea", named after an ancient Thracian seafaring people | Terra Cimmeria |
| Circaeum Promontorium | /sərˈsiːəm ˌprɒmənˈtɔːriəm/ | "Cape of Circe" | |
| Claritas | | Latin for "bright" | Claritas Fossae, Claritas Rupes |
| Clepsydra Fons | /klɛpˈsaɪdrə ˈfɒnz/ | "Water-clock fountain", a well in the Athenian acropolis. | |
| Coprates | /ˈkɒprətiːz/ | River Coprates, now called the Dez, in modern Iran | Coprates Chasma |
| Coracis Portus | /ˈkɒrəsɪs ˈpɔːrtəs/ | "Haven of Corax" | |
| Cyane Fons | /ˈsaɪəniː ˈfɒnz/ | "Cyane fountain", a spring in Sicily from which the Cyane river sprang, named for a nymph. | Cyane Catena, Cyane Fossae |
| Cydonia | /saɪˈdoʊniə/ | poetic name for Crete | Cydonia, Cydonia Mensae, Cydonia Labyrinthus, Cydonia Colles |
| Cynia Lacus | | | |
| Danaïdum Depressio | /dəˈneɪədəm dɪˈprɛʃioʊ/ | "Lowland of the daughters of Danaüs" | |
| Daphne | /ˈdæfniː/ | From Daphne ("bay laurel"), a nymph pursued by Apollo. | |
| Deucalionis Regio | /djuːˌkeɪliˈoʊnɪs ˈriːdʒioʊ/ | "Region of Deucalion" | |
| Dia | /ˈdaɪə/ | An island north of Crete | |
| Diacria | /daɪˈeɪkriə/ | Diacria highlands around Marathon | Diacria quadrangle |
| Dioscuria | /ˌdaɪəsˈkjʊəriə/ | "Land of the Dioscuri" | |
| Eden | /ˈiːdən/ | From Eden, the biblical paradise | Eden Patera |
| Edom | /ˈiːdəm/ | From Edom, an ancient kingdom in modern Jordan | |
| Edom Promontorium | /ˈiːdəm ˌprɒmənˈtɔːriəm/ | "Cape of Edom" | |
| Electris | /ɪˈlɛktrɪs/ | The principal island of the "Electrides", islands said to produce amber. | Electris Mons |
| Elysium | /ɪˈlɪʒiəm/ | From Elysium, the Greek land of dead heroes | Elysium Planitia, Elysium Mons, Elysium Fossae, Elysium quadrangle |
| Eridania | /ˌɛrɪˈdeɪniə/ | Land of the River Eridanus | Eridania Mons, Eridania Planitia, Eridania quadrangle, Eridania Scopulus |
| Mare Erythræum | /ˈmɛəriː ˌɛrɪˈθriːəm/ | "Red Sea" | Erythraea Fossa |

=== F-L ===
| Name | Pronunciation | Meaning | Modern name(s) |
|---|---|---|---|
| Famæ Depressio | /ˈfeɪmiː dɪˈprɛʃioʊ/ | "Lowland of Fame" | |
| Ferentinæ Lucus | /ˌfɛrɪnˈtaɪniː ˈljuːkəs/ | "Grove of Ferentina" | |
| Lucus Feronia | | "Grove of Wild Beasts" | |
| Flevo Lacus | /ˈfliːvoʊ ˈleɪkəs/ | | |
| Gallinaria Silva | /ˌɡælɪˈnɛəriə ˈsɪlvə/ | | |
| Mare Hadriaticum | /ˈmɛəriː ˌheɪdriˈætɪkəm/ | "Adriatic Sea" Aka Hadriaticum Mare | Hadriacus Mons, Hadriaca Patera |
| Hammonis Cornu | /həˈmoʊnɪs ˈkɔːrnjuː/ | "Horn of Ammon" | |
| Hellas | /ˈhɛləs/ | "Greece" | Hellas Planitia, Hellas Montes, Hellas quadrangle |
| Hellespontus | /ˌhɛləsˈpɒntəs/ | "Hellespont" | Hellespontus Montes |
| Heræum Promontorium | /hɪˈriːəm ˌprɒmənˈtɔːriəm/ | "Cape of Hera" | |
| Hercynia Silva | /hɜːrˈsɪniə ˈsɪlvə/ | Hercynian Forest | |
| Herculis Columnæ | /ˈhɜːrkjʊlɪs kɒˈlʌmniː/ | "Pillars of Hercules" | |
| Herculis Pons | /ˈhɜːrkjʊlɪs ˈpɒnz/ | "Bridge of Hercules" | |
| Hesperia | /hɛsˈpɪəriə/ | "Land of the Setting Sun" | Hesperia Dorsa, Hesperia Planum |
| Hesperidum Lacus | /hɛsˈpɛrɪdəm ˈleɪkəs/ | "Lake of the Hesperides" | |
| Hibe | /ˈhaɪbiː/ | | |
| Hippocrene Fons | /ˌhɪpəˈkriːniː ˈfɒnz/ | "Fountain of Hippocrene", near Mount Helicon | |
| Hipponitis Palus | | | |
| Horarum Promontorium | /hɒˈrɛərəm ˌprɒmənˈtɔːriəm/ | "Cape of the Hours" | Horarum Mons |
| Hypelæus | /ˌhɪpɪˈliːəs/ | A fountain in Ephesus. | |
| Hyperboreus Lacus | | Greek/Latin: Far Northern Lake | Hyperboreae Undae |
| Iapygia | /ˌaɪəˈpɪdʒiə/ | Salento in Italy, ancient home of the Iapyges | Iapygia quadrangle |
| Icaria | /aɪˈkɛəriə/ | | Icaria Fossae, Icaria Planum |
| Mare Icarium | /ˈmɛəriː aɪˈkɛəriəm/ | | |
| Ierne | /aɪˈɜːrniː/ | A name for Ireland | |
| Isidis Regio | /ˈɪsɪdɪs ˈriːdʒioʊ/ | "Region of Isis" | Isidis Planitia |
| Ismenius Lacus | /ɪzˈmiːniəs ˈleɪkəs/ | The Ismenian Spring near Thebes where Cadmus slew the guardian dragon | Ismenia Patera, Ismeniae Fossae Ismenius Cavus, Ismenius Lacus quadrangle |
| Jani Fretum | /ˈdʒeɪnaɪ ˈfriːtəm/ | "Strait of Janus" | Iani Chaos |
| Juventæ Fons | /dʒuːˈvɛntiː ˈfɒnz/ | "Fountain of Youth" a.k.a. Fons Juventæ | Juventae Chasma, Juventae Dorsa |
| Labeatis Lacus | /læbiːˈeɪtɪs ˈleɪkəs/ | Lake of the Labeates, a people of Illyria | |
| Lausonius Lacus | /lɔːˈsoʊniəs ˈleɪkəs/ | | |
| Lemuria | /lɪˈmjʊəriə/ | From Lemuria, a fictional sunken land in the Pacific or Indian Ocean | |
| Lerne | /ˈlɜːrniː/ | | |
| Libya | /ˈlɪbiə/ | "Libya" | Libya Montes |
| Lucrinus Lacus | | The Lucrine Lake in Roman Italy | |
| Lunæ Lacus | /ˈljuːniː ˈleɪkəs/ | "Lake of the Moon" a.k.a. Lacus Lunæ | Lunae Palus quadrangle, Lunae Planum |

=== M-N ===
| Name | Pronunciation | Meaning | Modern name(s) |
|---|---|---|---|
| Mæisia Silva | | | |
| Mapharitis | | | |
| Mareotis | /ˌmæriːˈoʊtɪs/ | "Land about Mareota", in Lower Egypt. | Mareotis Fossae |
| Margaritifer Sinus | /ˌmɑːrɡəˈrɪtɪfər ˈsaɪnəs/ | "Pearlbearing Bay" | Margaritifer Terra, Margaritifer Sinus quadrangle |
| Lucus Maricæ | /ˈljuːkəs məˈraɪsiː/ | "Grove of Maríca", a nymph of Latium. | Lucus Planum |
| Memnonia | /mɛmˈnoʊniə/ | "Land of Memnon" | Memnonia Fossae, Memnonia quadrangle |
| Meroë Insula | /ˈmɛroʊiː ˈɪnsjʊlə/ | "Island of Meroe" | Meroe Patera |
| Messeis Fons | | | |
| Lacus Mœris | /ˈleɪkəs ˈmɪərɪs/ | Lake Moeris, a lake in the Egyptian Fayum | |
| Mons Argenteus | /ˈmɒnz ɑːrˈdʒɛntiːəs/ | "Silver mountain" | Dorsa Argentea, Argentea Planum |
| Neith Regio | /ˈniːθ ˈriːdʒioʊ/ | "Region of Neith" | |
| Nepheles Depressio | /ˈnɛfɪliːz dɪˈprɛʃioʊ/ | "Lowland of cloud" | |
| Nereïdum Promontorium | /nɪˈriːɪdəm ˌprɒmənˈtɔːriəm/ | "Cape of the Nereids | Nereidum Montes |
| Nerigos | /ˈnɛrɪɡɒs/ | Name of a fictional country, supposedly in or near Scandinavia | |
| Nessonis Lacus | | | |
| Niliacus Lacus | /nɪˈlaɪəkəs ˈleɪkəs/ | "Lake of the Nile" | Colles Nili |
| Nilokeras | | "Horn of the Nile" | Nilokeras Fossae, Nilokeras Mensae |
| Nitriæ | /ˈnaɪtrɪiː/ | | |
| Nix Atlantica | /ˈnɪks ætˈlæntɪkə/ | "Atlantic Snow" | —N/a |
| Nix Olympica | /ˈnɪks ɒˈlɪmpɪkə/ | "Olympian Snow" | Olympus Maculae, Olympus Mons, Olympus Patera, Olympus Rupes |
| Noachis | /ˈnoʊəkɪs/ | "Land of Noah" | Noachis quadrangle, Noachis Terra |
| Nodus Gordii | /ˈnoʊdəs ˈɡɔːrdiaɪ/ | "Gordian Knot" | Gordii Dorsum |
| Noti Sinus | /ˈnoʊtaɪ ˈsaɪnəs/ | "Bay of Notus" | |
| Novissima Thyle | /noʊˈvɪsəmə ˈθaɪliː/ | "Newest Thule" | |
| Nuba Lacus | /ˈnjuːbə ˈleɪkəs/ | | |

=== O-S ===
| Name | Pronunciation | Meaning | Modern name(s) |
|---|---|---|---|
| Mare Oceanidum | /ˈmɛəriː oʊʃiːˈænɪdəm/ | "Sea of the Oceanids" | Oceanidum Fossa, Oceanidum Mons |
| Octantis Depressio | /ɒkˈtæntɪs dɪˈprɛʃioʊ/ | "Lowland of Octans" | Octantis Cavi, Octantis Mons |
| Œnotria | /ɪˈnoʊtriə/ | | Oenotria Plana, Oenotria Scopuli |
| Ogygis Regio | /ˈɒdʒɪdʒɪs ˈriːdʒioʊ/ | "Region of Ogyges" | Ogygis Rupes, Ogygis Undae |
| Ophir | /ˈoʊfər/ | From Ophir, a biblical land of gold | Ophir Catenae, Ophir Cavi, Ophir Chasma, Ophir Planum |
| Ortygia | /ɔːrˈtɪdʒiə/ | | Ortygia Colles |
| Oxia Palus | /ˈɒkʃiə ˈpeɪləs/ | Oxeia, a Greek Island in Ionian Sea | Oxia Chaos, Oxia Colles, Oxia Palus quadrangle |
| Palicorum Lacus | /ˌpælɪˈkɔːrəm ˈleɪkəs/ | | |
| Palinuri Fretum | /ˌpælɪˈnjʊəraɪ ˈfriːtəm/ | "Strait of Palinurus" | |
| Palinuri Sinus | /ˌpælɪˈnjʊəraɪ ˈsaɪnəs/ | "Bay of Palinurus" | |
| Pallas Lacus | /ˌpæləs ˈleɪkəs/ | "Lake of Pallas" | |
| Panchaia | /pæŋˈkeɪə/ | From the name of an island supposed to be in South Arabia | Panchaia Rupes |
| Pandorae Fretum | /pænˈdɔːraɪ/ | Pandora's strait | |
| Phaëthontis | /ˌfeɪ.ɪˈθɒntɪs/ | "Land of Phaethon or Phaethon (son of Eos)" | Phaethontis quadrangle |
| Phlegra | /ˈfliːɡrə/ | From a district in Macedonia. | Phlegra Montes |
| Campi Phlegræi | /ˈkæmpaɪ flɪˈɡriːaɪ/ | "Fields of Phlegra" | Phlegra Montes |
| Phœnicis Lacus | /fɪˈnaɪsɪs ˈleɪkəs/ | "Lake of the Phoenix" a.k.a. Lacus Phœnicis | Phoenicis Lacus quadrangle |
| Phrixi Regio | /ˈfrɪksaɪ ˈriːdʒioʊ/ | "Region of Phrixus" | Phrixi Rupes |
| Piscis Depressio | /ˈpaɪsɪs dɪˈprɛʃioʊ/ | "Depression of the Fish" | |
| Depressio Pontica | /dɪˈprɛʃioʊ ˈpɒntɪkə/ | "Lowland of Pontus" | |
| Promethei Sinus | /proʊˈmiːθiːaɪ ˈsaɪnəs/ | "Bay of Prometheus" | Promethei Terra |
| Propontis | /proʊˈpɒntɪs/ | From an old name for the Sea of Marmara | |
| Protei Regio | /ˈproʊtiːaɪ ˈriːdʒioʊ/ | "Region of Proteus" | |
| Pyrrhæ Regio | /ˈpɪriː ˈriːdʒioʊ/ | "Region of Pyrrha" | Pyrrhae Chaos, Pyrrhae Fossae |
| Rupes Tenuis | | Latin: "Thin Cliff" | Tenuis Mensae, Rupes Tenuis |
| Sinus Sabæus | /ˈsaɪnəs səˈbiːəs/ | "Bay of Sheba" Aka Sabaeus Sinus | Terra Sabaea, Sinus Sabaeus quadrangle |
| Scandia | /ˈskændiə/ | From a name for Skåne or Scandinavia | Scandia Cavi, Scandia Colles, Scandia Tholi |
| Scheria Insula | /ˈskɪəriə ˈɪnsjʊlə/ | "Scheria Island" | |
| Semiramidis Lacus | /ˌsɛmɪˈræmɪdɪs ˈleɪkəs/ | "Lake of Semiramis" | |
| Serapium | | | |
| Simoëntis Sinus | /ˌsɪmoʊˈɛntɪs ˈsaɪnəs/ | "Bay of Simois" | Simois Colles |
| Sirbonis Palus | | The army-swallowing Serbonian Bog near Mt Casius in Egypt | —N/a |
| Mare Sirenum | /ˈmɛəriː saɪˈriːnəm/ | "Sea of Sirens" | Terra Sirenum |
| Socratis Promontorium | /ˈsɒkrətɪs ˌprɒmənˈtɔːriəm/ | "Cape of Socrates" | |
| Solis Fons | /ˈsoʊlɪs ˈfɒnz/ | "Fountain of the Sun" | Obsolete |
| Solis Lacus | /ˈsoʊlɪs ˈleɪkəs/ | "Lake of the Sun" | Solis Planum |
| Stygis | | "Styx River", Greece | Stygis Catena, Stygis Fossae |
| Syrtis Major | /ˈsɜːrtɪs ˈmeɪdʒər/ | a Libyan gulf, now Gulf of Sidra | Syrtis Major Planum, Syrtis Major quadrangle |
| Syrtis Minor | /ˈsɜːrtɪs ˈmaɪnər/ | now Gulf of Gabès in Tunisia. a.k.a. Syrtis Parva | |

=== T-Z ===
| Name | Pronunciation | Meaning | Modern name(s) |
|---|---|---|---|
| Tempe | /ˈtɛmpiː/ | Vale of Tempe, Greece | Tempe Fossae, Tempe Terra |
| Tharsis | /ˈθɑːrsɪs/ | "Tarshish" ancient source of ship-loads of silver. Possibly Tartessos or Sardinia | Tharsis Montes, Tharsis quadrangle |
| Thaumasia | /θɔːˈmeɪʒə/ | "Land of Wonders" | Thaumasia Planum, Thaumasia quadrangle |
| Thyle I | /ˈθaɪliː ˈpraɪmə/ | "First Thule" | Thyles Montes, Thyles Rupes |
| Thyle II | /ˈθaɪliː sɪˈkʌndə/ | "Second Thule" | |
| Thyles Collis | /ˈθaɪliːz ˈkɒlɪs/ | "Hill of Thule" | |
| Thyles Mons | /ˈθaɪliːz ˈmɒnz/ | "Mountain of Thule" | |
| Thymiamata | /ˌθɪmiˈæmətə/ | "Incenses" | |
| Tiphys Fretum | /ˈtaɪfɪs ˈfriːtəm/ | | |
| Titanum Sinus | /taɪˈteɪnəm ˈsaɪnəs/ | "Bay of the Titans" | |
| Tithonius Lacus | /tɪˈθoʊniəs ˈleɪkəs/ | | Tithoniae Catenae, Tithoniae Fossae, Tithonium Chasma |
| Trinythios | | | |
| Trivii Fons | /ˈtrɪviaɪ ˈfɒnz/ | "Fountain of the Crossroads" (east of Trivium Charontis) | |
| Trivium Charontis | /ˈtrɪviəm kəˈrɒntɪs/ | "Crossroads of Charon" | |
| Mare Tyrrhenum | /ˈmɛəriː tɪˈriːnəm/ | "Tyrrhenian Sea" | Mare Tyrrhenum quadrangle, Tyrrhenus Mons, Tyrrhena Terra |
| Uchronia | /juːˈkroʊniə/ | "Nowhen" | |
| Ulyxis Fretum | /juːˈlɪksɪs ˈfriːtəm/ | "Strait of Ulysses" | Ulyxis Rupes |
| Utopia | /juːˈtoʊpiə/ | "Nowhere, Utopia" | Utopia Planitia |
| Vulcani Pelagus | /vʌlˈkeɪnaɪ ˈpɛləɡəs/ | "Sea of Vulcan" | |
| Xanthi Sinus | /ˈzænθaɪ ˈsaɪnəs/ | "Bay of Xanthus" | Xanthe Dorsa, Xanthe Terra |
| Xisuthri Regio | /zɪˈsuːθraɪ ˈriːdʒioʊ/ | "Region of Xisuthrus" | |
| Yaonis Regio | /ˈjeɪənɪs ˈriːdʒioʊ/ | "Region of Emperor Yao" | |
| Zephyria | /zɪˈfɪriə/ | "Land of the West Wind (Zephyr)" | Zephyria Planum, Zephyria Mensae |

== See also ==
- Aspledon Undae
- Dark dune spots
- List of craters on Mars
- List of Martian canals
- Mars
- Martian canals
- Siton Undae
