= List of catenae on Mars =

This is a list of named catenae on Mars. In planetary geology, a catena is a chain of similarly sized craters. On Mars, they are named after nearby classical albedo features as prescribed by the International Astronomical Union's rules for planetary nomenclature. While catenae on most bodies of the Solar System consist of mainly of impact craters, those on Mars consist primarily of collapse pits.

Name	Coordinates
Acheron Catena	37.3°N 259.0°E
Alba Catena	35.0°N 245.3°E
Artynia Catena	47.6°N 240.4°E
Baphyras Catena	38.8°N 275.7°E
Ceraunius Catena	37.1°N 251.8°E
Coprates Catena	14.9°S 297.8°E
Cyane Catena	36.3°N 241.6°E
Elysium Catena	17.6°N 149.6°E
Ganges Catena	2.8°S 291.3°E
Hyblaeus Catena	21.6°N 140.5°E
Labeatis Catenae	19.5°N 266.7°E
Ophir Catenae	9.5°S 300.6°E
Phlegethon Catena	38.9°N 256.7°E
Stygis Catena	23.3°N 150.5°E
Tithoniae Catenae	5.3°S 277.6°E
Tractus Catena	27.8°N 257.3°E

== See also ==
- List of craters on Mars
