= Aganippe (disambiguation) =

Aganippe may refer to:

- Aganippe, several figures in Greek mythology
- Aganippe (spider), a spider genus in the family Idiopidae
- Aganippe Fossa, a surface feature on Mars
- Delias aganippe, the wood white, a butterfly species endemic to Australia
