= Hippocrene =

Spring on Mount Helicon in Greek mythology

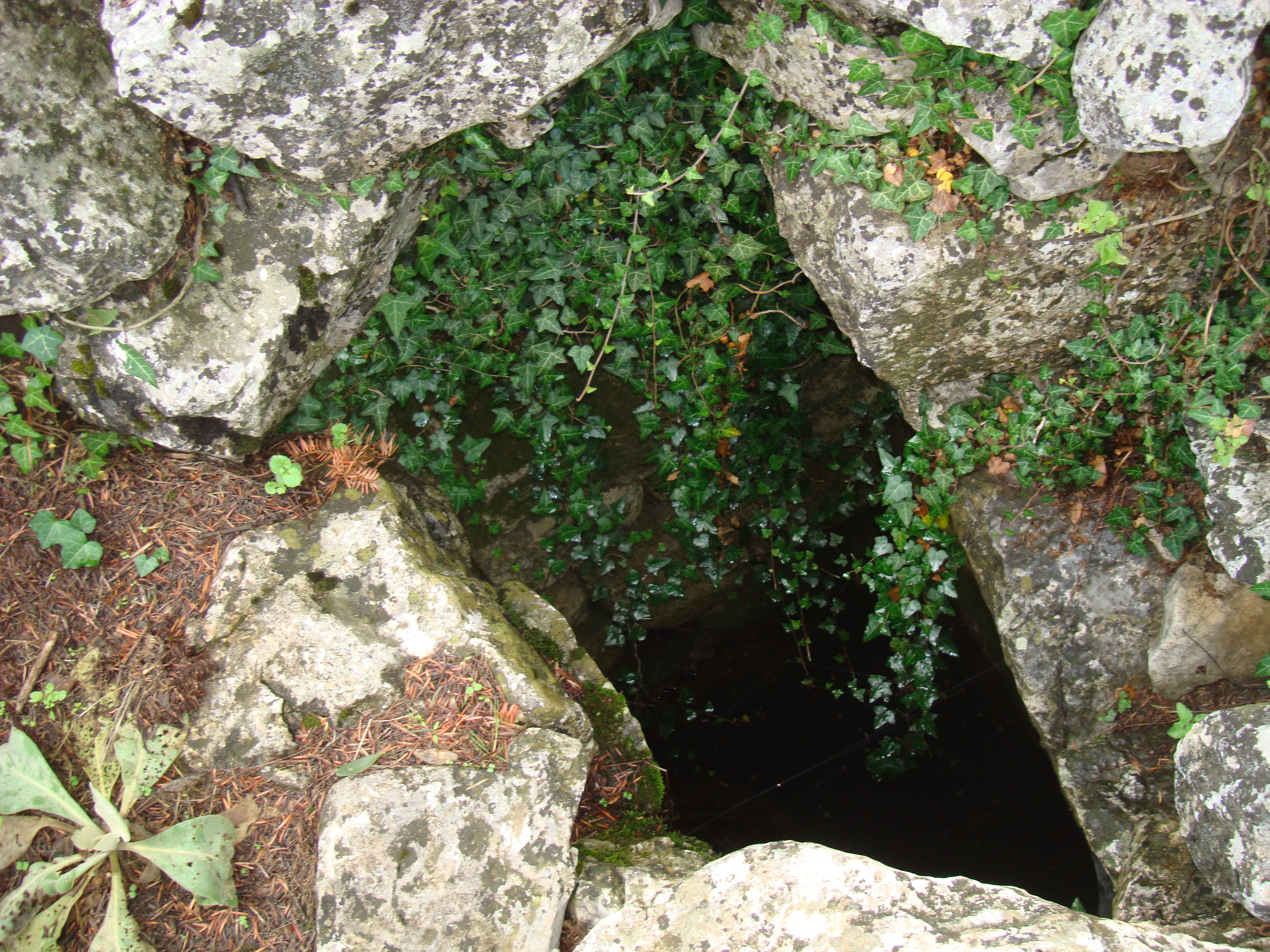
Hippocrene source on Mount Helicon

In Greek mythology, Hippocrene /hɪpəˈkriːniː/ (Ancient Greek: Ἵππου κρήνη or Ἱπποκρήνη or Ἱππουκρήνη) is a spring on Mount Helicon. It was sacred to the Muses and was said to have formed when the winged horse Pegasus struck his hoof into the ground, whence its name which literally translates as "Steed/Horse's Fountain". The water was supposed to bring forth poetic inspiration when imbibed.

== Sources ==
Hesiod refers to the horse's well on Helicon in his Theogony.

And after they have washed their tender skin in Permessus or Hippocrene or holy Olmeidus, they perform choral dances on highest Helicon, beautiful, lovely ones, and move nimbly with their feet.

Petrarch refers to the fountain of Helicon in his epic poem Africa:

Sisters who are my sweet care,
If I sing to you of wonders,
I pray that it be granted to me
To drink again at the fountain of Helicon.

Camoens cites the fountain as a great source of poetic inspiration in his epic Portuguese poem The Lusiads, as translated:

And you, my Tagian Nymphs, oh, since my rhyme
With ardent genius new you now inspire,
If I was wont, well pleased, in former time
To celebrate your stream with humble lyre,
Oh, grant me now a lofty note sublime,
A grand and glowing line of poet's fire,
That of your waters Phoebus may ordain:
They shall not envy those of Hippocrene.

John Keats refers to Hippocrene in his poem "Ode to a Nightingale".

O for a beaker full of the warm South
Full of the true, the blushful Hippocrene,
With beaded bubbles winking at the brim,
And purple-stained mouth;
That I might drink, and leave the world unseen,
And with thee fade away into the forest dim:

Henry Wadsworth Longfellow mentions the fountain in his poem "Goblet of Life":

No purple flowers,—no garlands green,
Conceal the goblet's shade or sheen,
Nor maddening draughts of Hippocrene,
Like gleams of sunshine, flash between
Thick leaves of mistletoe.

== See also ==
- Aganippe
- Silverlock
