= Aganippe (naiad) =

Ancient Greek mythological figure

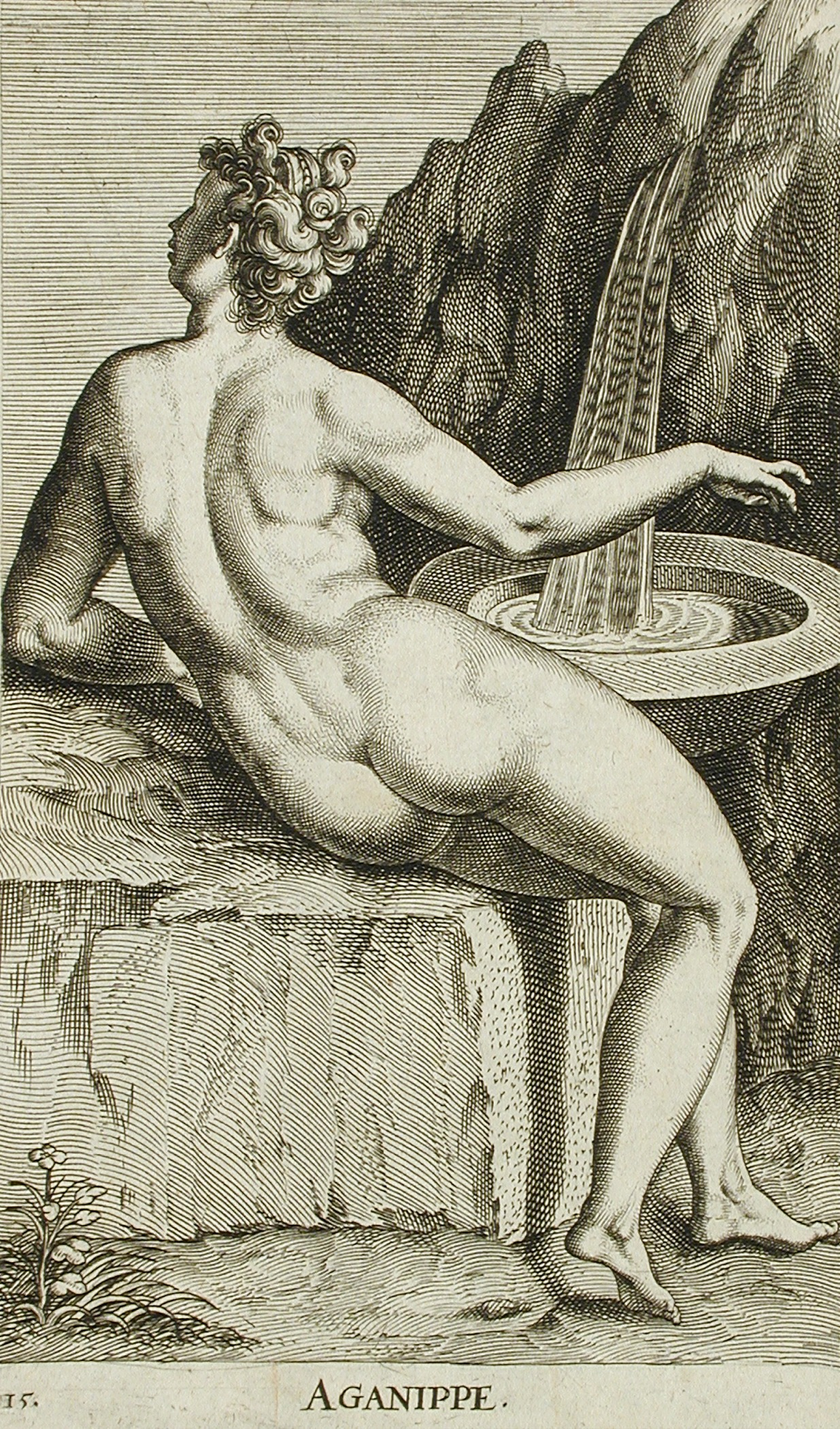
Aganippe by Philip Galle (Holland, Haarlem, 1537-1612)

In Greek mythology, Aganippe (/æɡəˈnɪpiː/; Ancient Greek: Ἀγανίππη, romanized: Aganíppē, lit. 'mare who kills mercifully') was the name of both a spring and the Naiad (a Crinaea) associated with it. The spring is in Boeotia, near Thespiae, at the base of Mount Helicon, and was associated with the Muses who were sometimes called Aganippides. Drinking from her well, it was considered to be a source of poetic inspiration. The nymph is called a daughter of the river-god Permessus (called Termessus by Pausanias). Ovid associates Aganippe with Hippocrene.
