= Ariadnes Colles =

Surface feature on Mars

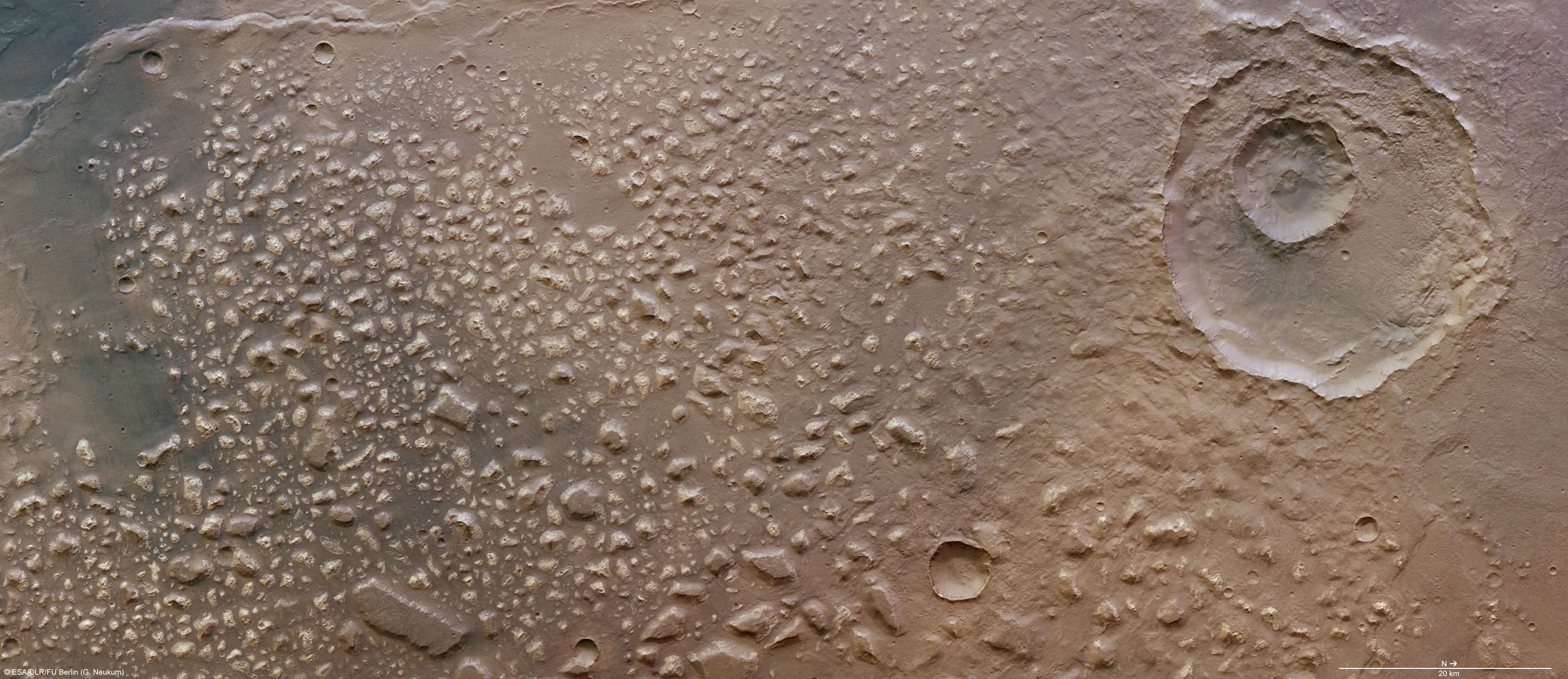
- The west of Ariadnes Colles, as seen by HRSC camera of the Mars Express. North is on the right
- Location: Phaethontis quadrangle
- Coordinates: 34.5°S 172.78°E

Ariadnes Colles is a region of colles (hills) in the northeast of Eridania quadrangle of Mars. It is located around 34.5 ° south latitude, and 172.78° east longitude. It covers 180 by 160 kilometers (112 by 99 mi). The feature was named after a classic albedo feature by the IAU in 1982.

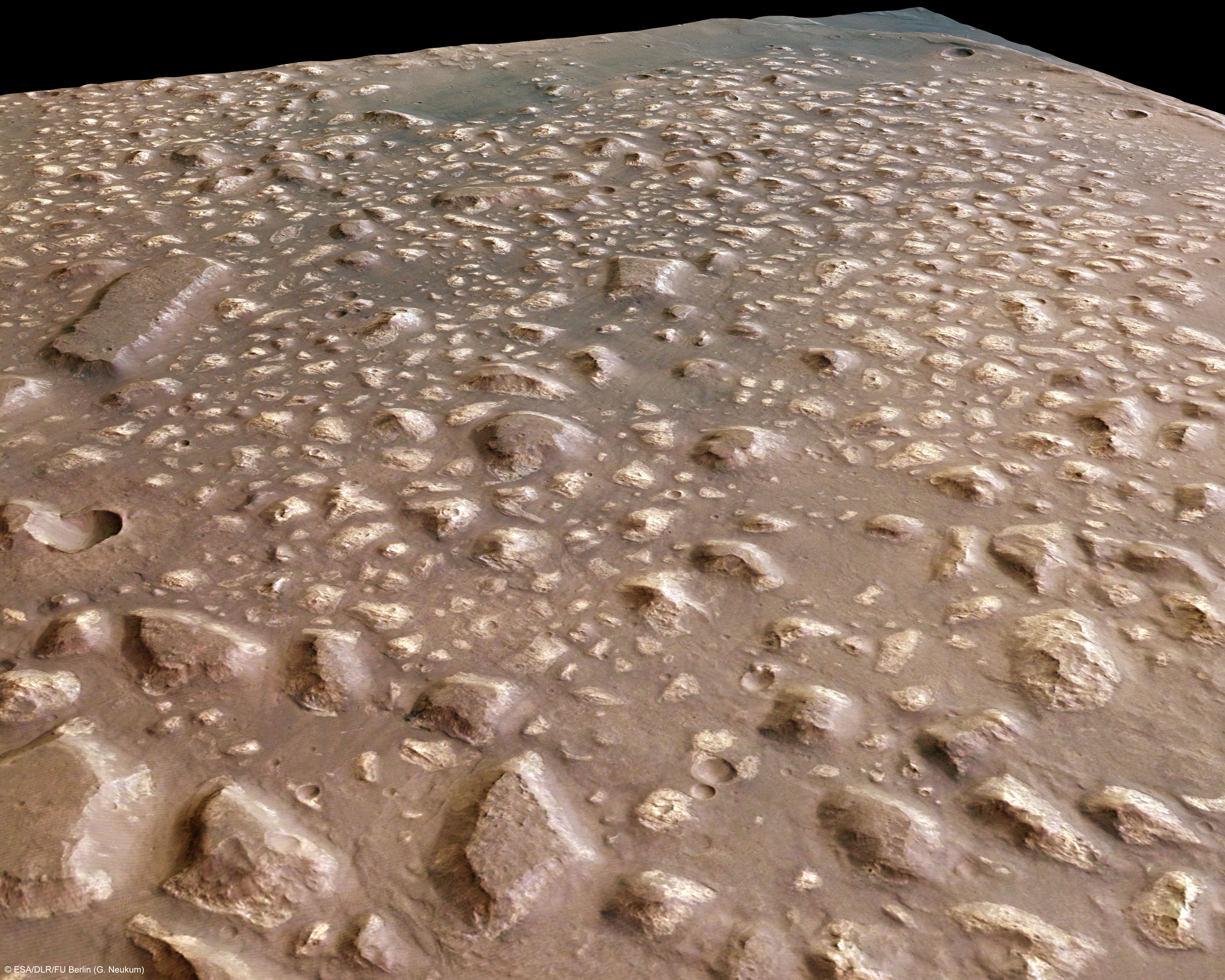
Perspective view of Ariadnes Colles by HRSC of the Mars Express. As the photo was taken toward the southwest, north is on the bottom right

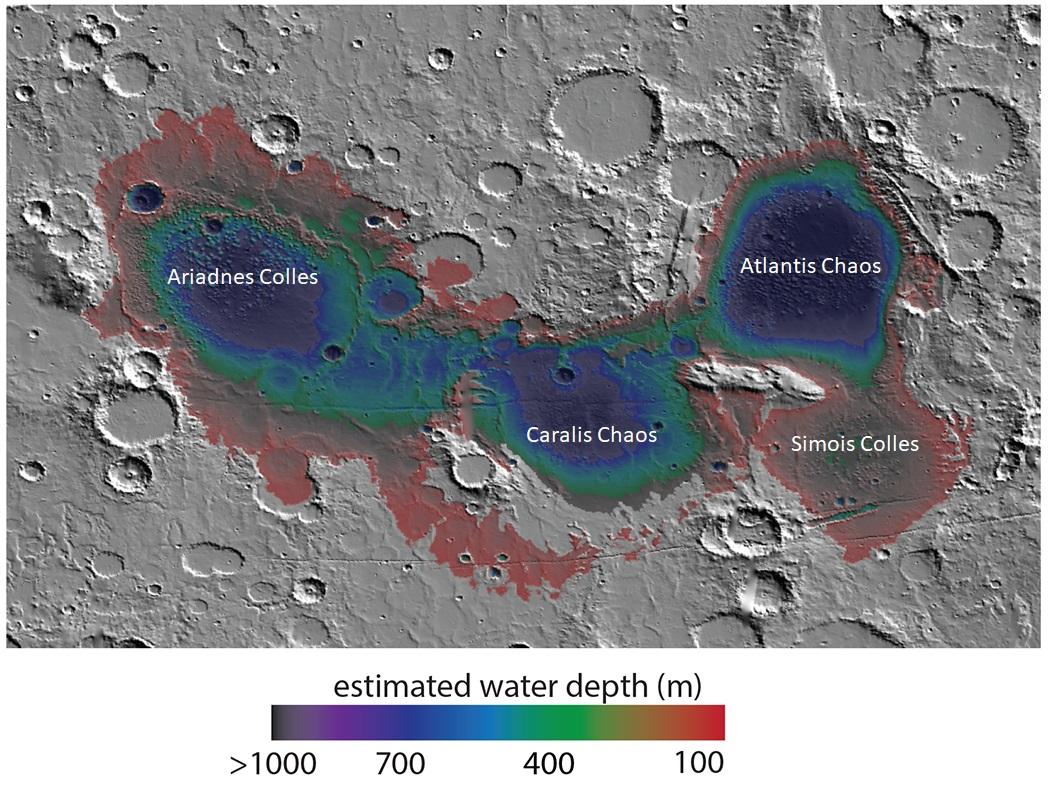
Map of Eridania Lake
