= Collis (planetary nomenclature) =

Collis /ˈkɒlɪs/ (plural: colles /ˈkɒliːz/, from the Latin word for "hill") is a small hill or knob on a celestial body. The term is used in planetary nomenclature: it is a part of international proper names of such features. Like other generic terms, it is capitalized and stands after the proper name (for example, Bilbo Colles; the only exception is Colles Nili on Mars). As of 2015, only groups of the hills have names, and the term is used only in plural.

Like the other terms of planetary nomenclature, this word describes only external view of the features, but not their origin or geological structure. So, it is used for hills of any origin. Names of bigger (especially domical) uplands usually contain the term Tholus ("dome"), and the names of still bigger mountains – the term Mons ("mountain"). Peculiar round mountains, which are found on Venus, get names with the term Farrum.

The term Collis was introduced into planetary nomenclature in 1982, on XVIIIth General Assembly of International Astronomical Union. This year two groups of hills on Mars were named (Ariadnes Colles and Deuteronilus Colles). As of May 2015, 43 such groups are named: 22 on Mars, 16 on Venus and 5 on Titan. On different celestial bodies they are named differently:

- on Venus, after sea goddesses
- on Mars, after nearby albedo features on classical maps by Giovanni Schiaparelli or Eugène Antoniadi
- on Titan, after characters from Tolkien's Middle-earth
- on Pluto, after pioneering spacecraft
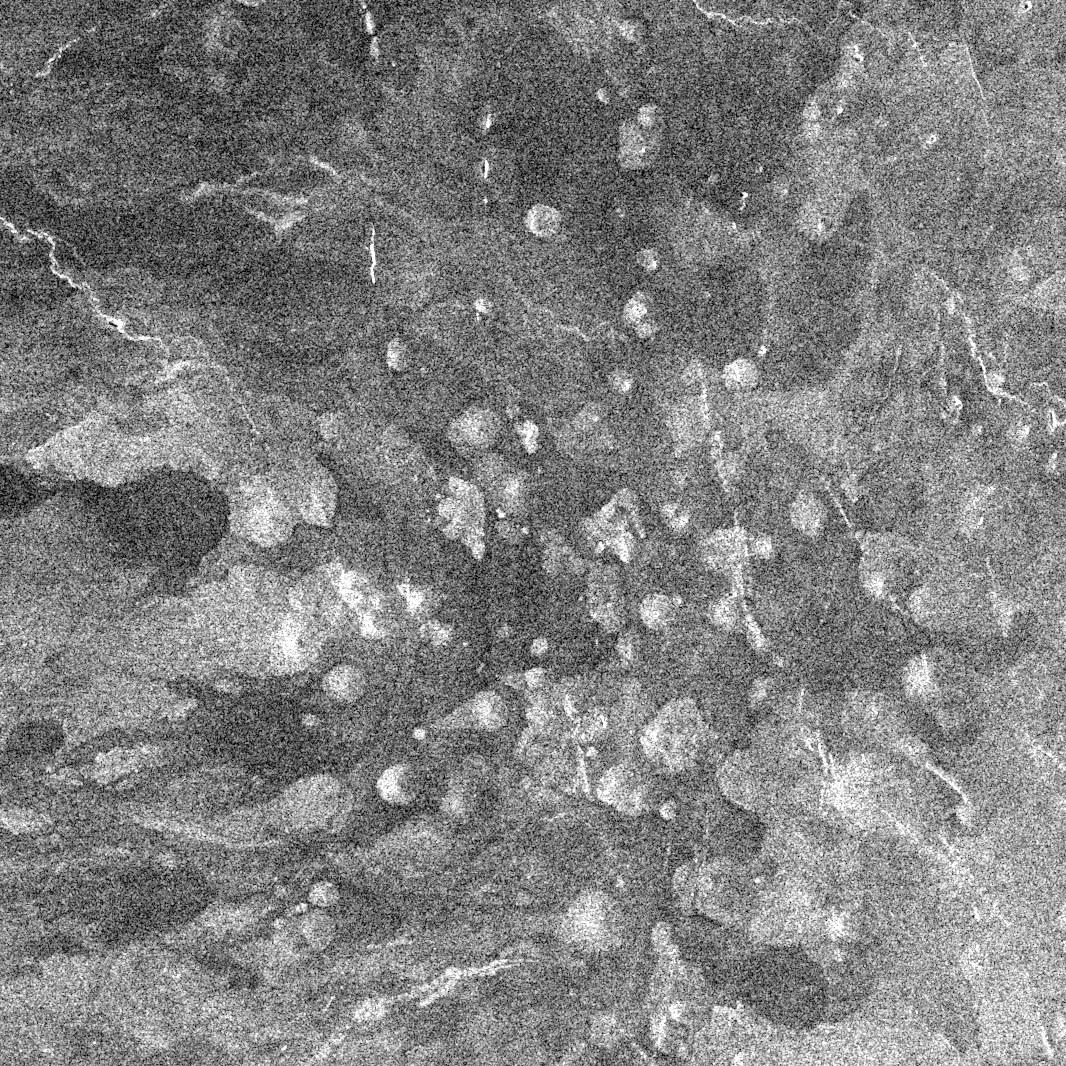
Part of Olosa Colles on Venus

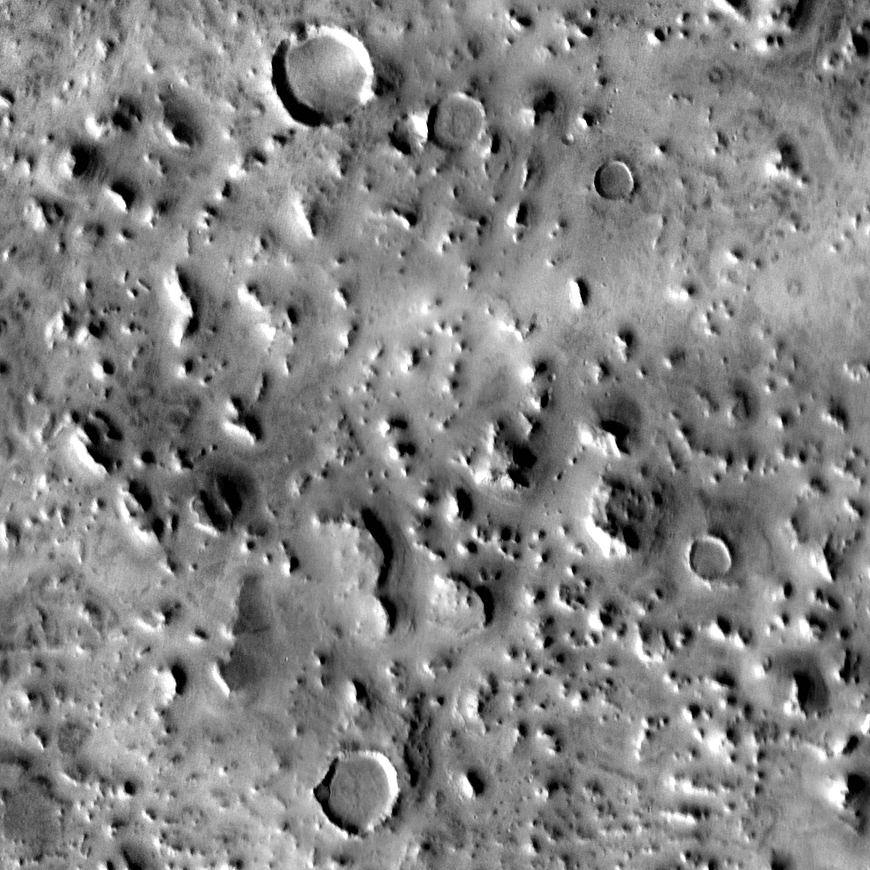
Part of Acidalia Colles on Mars

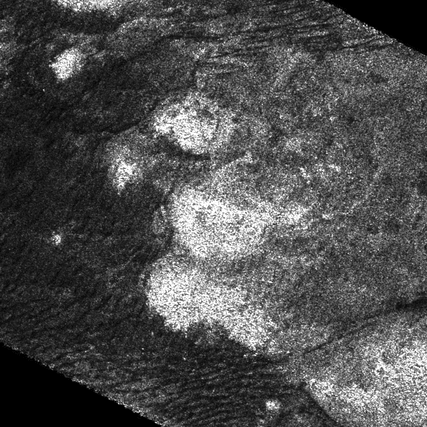
Nimloth Colles on Titan

== Links ==
- Current lists of features with the term Colles in the name: on Venus, on Mars, on Titan
- Media related to Colles at Wikimedia Commons
