= Hellespontus Montes =

Montes on Mars

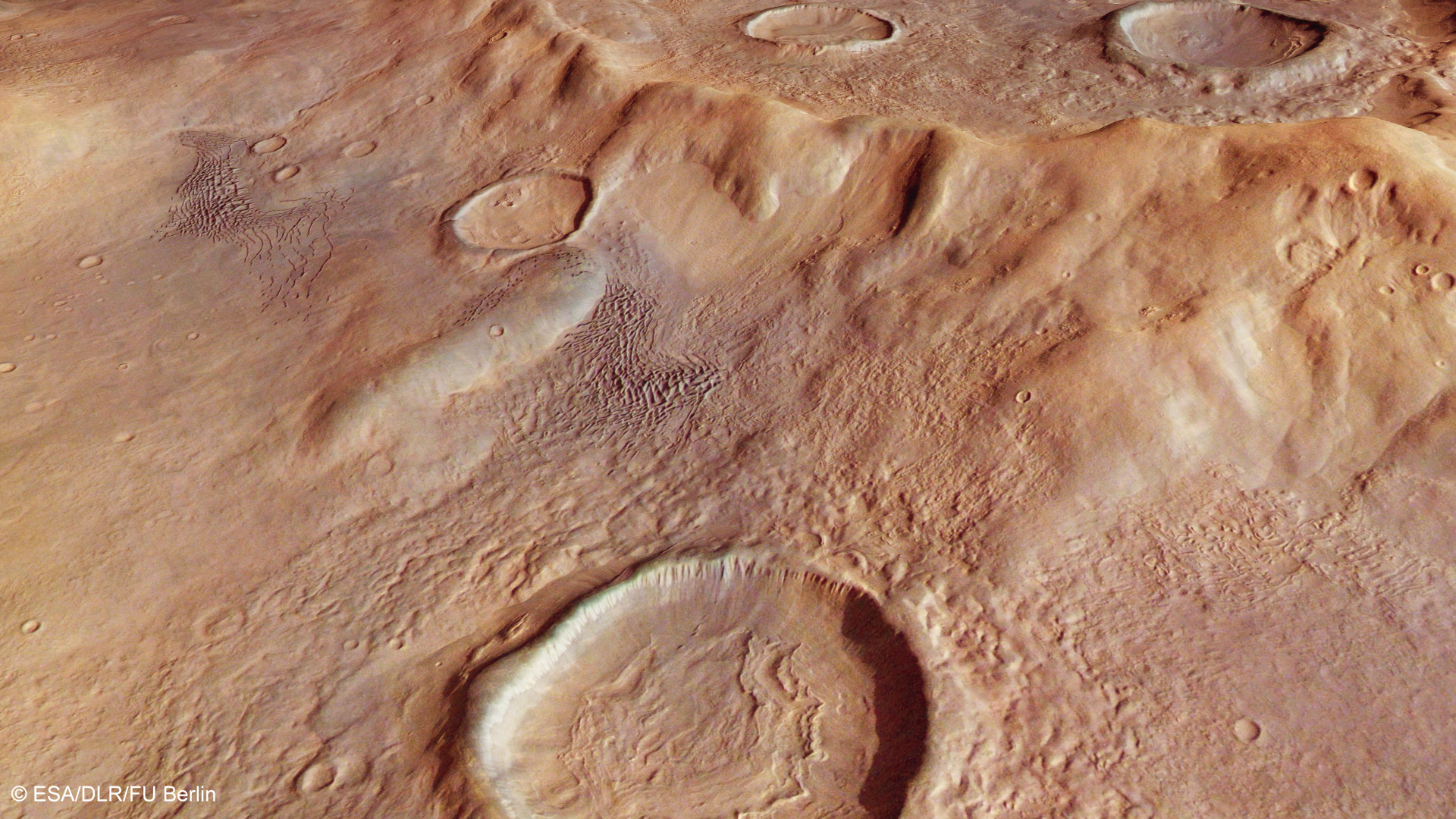
- Computer-generated perspective view of Hellespontum Montes from the High-Resolution Stereo Camera (HRSC) on ESA’s Mars Express.
- Location: Noachis quadrangle
- Coordinates: 44.37°S 42.76°E
- Length: 711 km
- Eponym: Hellespont, Classical albedo feature

The Hellespontus Montes is a mountain range on Mars. It stretches 711 km from north to south. It is in the Noachis quadrangle and the southeasternmost area of Noachis Terra, and is located midway between the highland area of Noachis and the impact basin Hellas Planitia. The mountains are named after a Classical albedo feature.
