= Chronius Mons =

Martian volcano

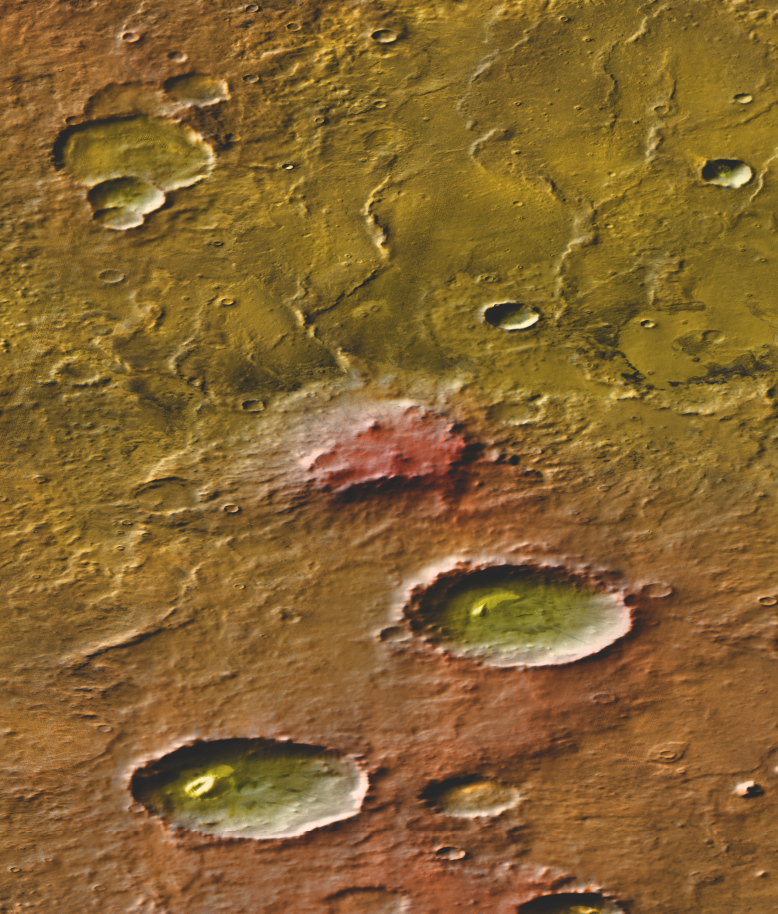
- Chronius Mons is the large feature visible above the two craters in the center of the Photograph.
- Location: Eridania quadrangle
- Coordinates: 61°12′S 178°12′E
- Peak: 3,240 m (10,630 ft) above datum

Chronius Mons is an extinct shield volcano located on Eridania quadrangle of the planet Mars. The name Chronius Mons is a classical albedo name. This was approved by International Astronomical Union on September 13, 2006.
