= Bilbo Colles =

Cluster of hills on Titan

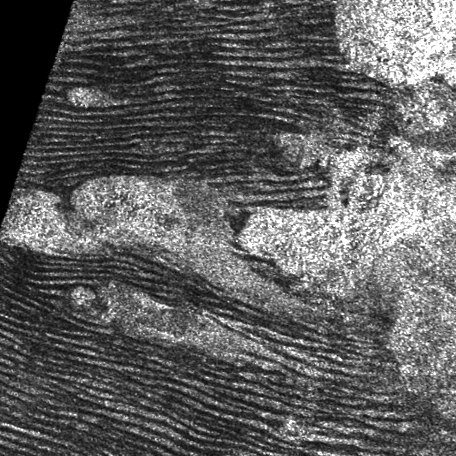
Bilbo Colles: radar image by Cassini. Thin dark streaks around are dunes.

Bilbo Colles is an area of small hills on Titan, the largest moon of the planet Saturn. The hills are located near Titan's equator at 4.23°S 38.56°W on western edge of bright region Quivira.

Bilbo Colles is named after Bilbo Baggins, a hobbit in J. R. R. Tolkien's fictional world of Middle Earth who appears most prominently in The Hobbit. The name follows a convention that Titanean colles (hills or small knobs) are named after characters in Tolkien's work. The name was formally announced on December 19, 2012.
