= Amenthes Fossae =

Martian geographical feature

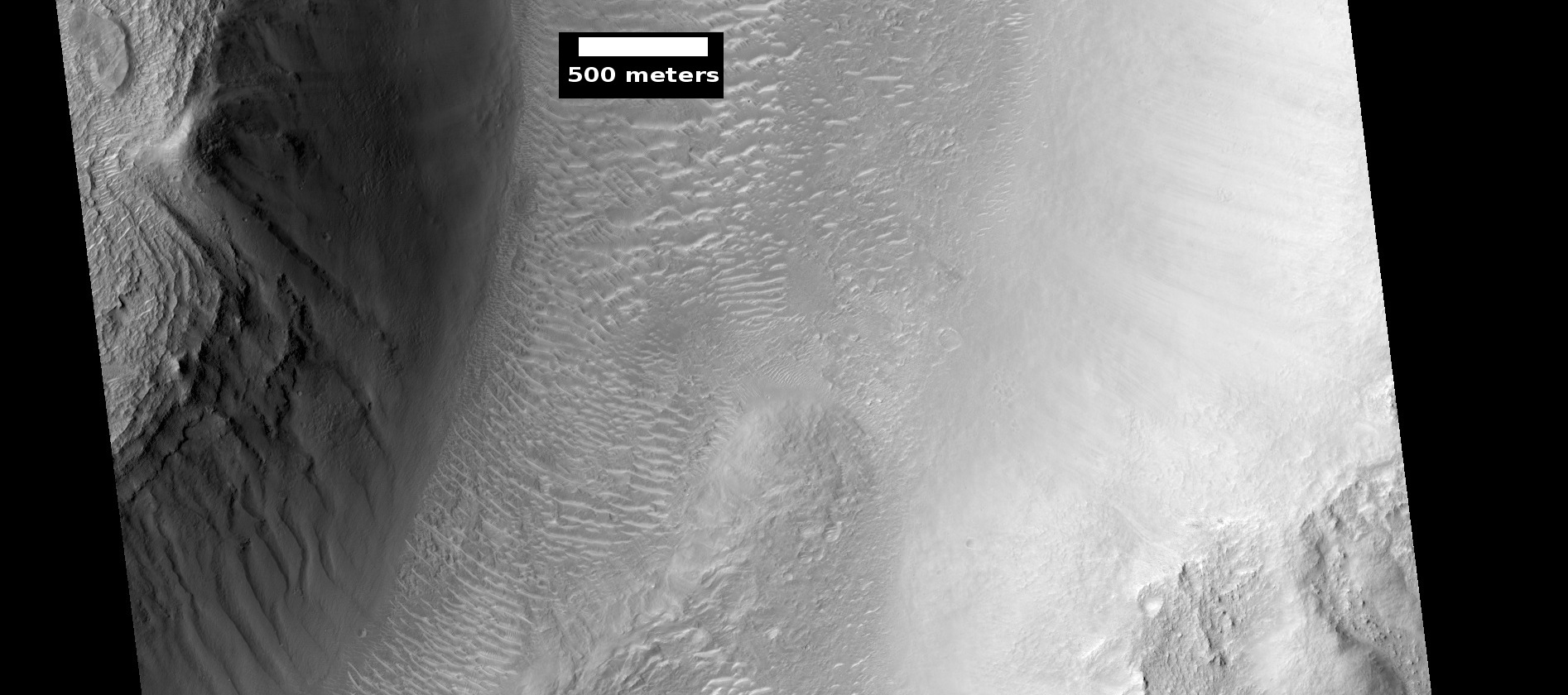
Wall of trough of Amenthes Fossae, as seen by HiRISE under HiWish program.

The Amenthes Fossae are a system of troughs in the Amenthes quadrangle of Mars centered at 9.07°N and 102.68°E. They are 850 km across and were named after a classical albedo feature. The classical albedo feature name was based on the Egyptian name for a place where souls of the dead go (Amenthes or Duat). The name Amenthes Fossae was approved in 1976.

The term "fossae" is used to indicate large troughs when using geographical terminology related to Mars. Troughs, sometimes also called grabens, form when the crust is stretched until it breaks, which forms two breaks with a middle section moving down, leaving steep cliffs along the sides. Sometimes, a line of pits form as materials collapse into a void that forms from the stretching.

== See also ==
- Amenthes quadrangle

== See also ==
- Fossa (geology)
- Geology of Mars
- HiRISE
- HiWish
