= Acidalia Colles =

Group of hills in the Mare Acidalium quadrangle of Mars

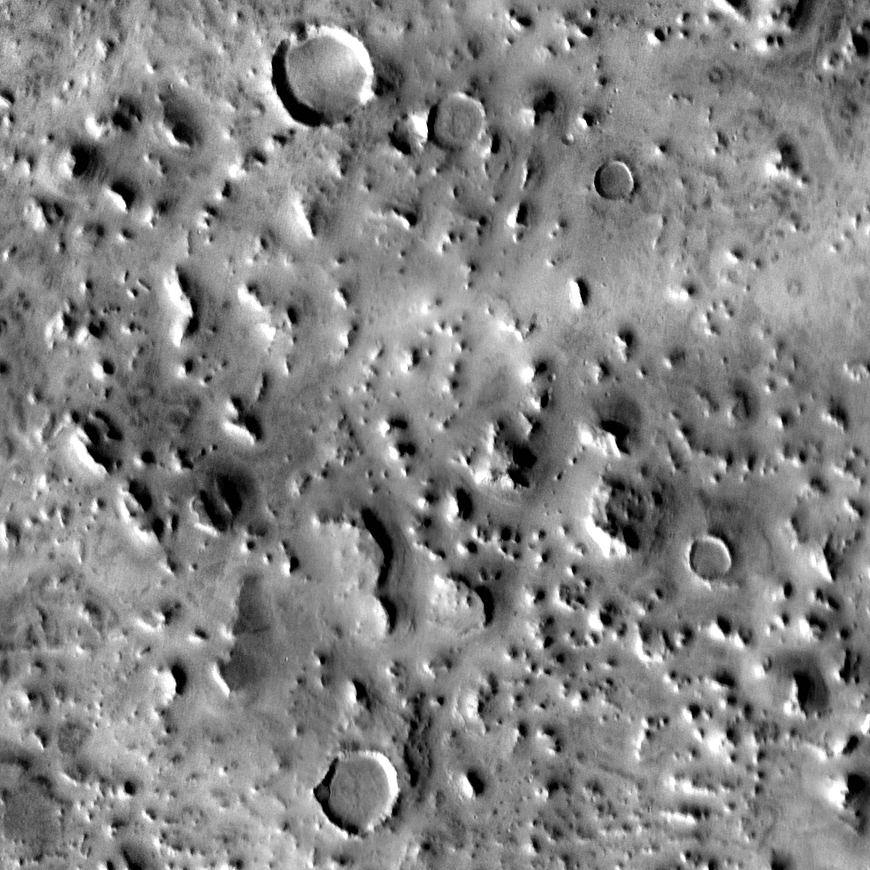
- Part of Acidalia Colles. Image size is 100×100 km
- Feature type: Hill cluster
- Coordinates: 50.9°N 23.1°W

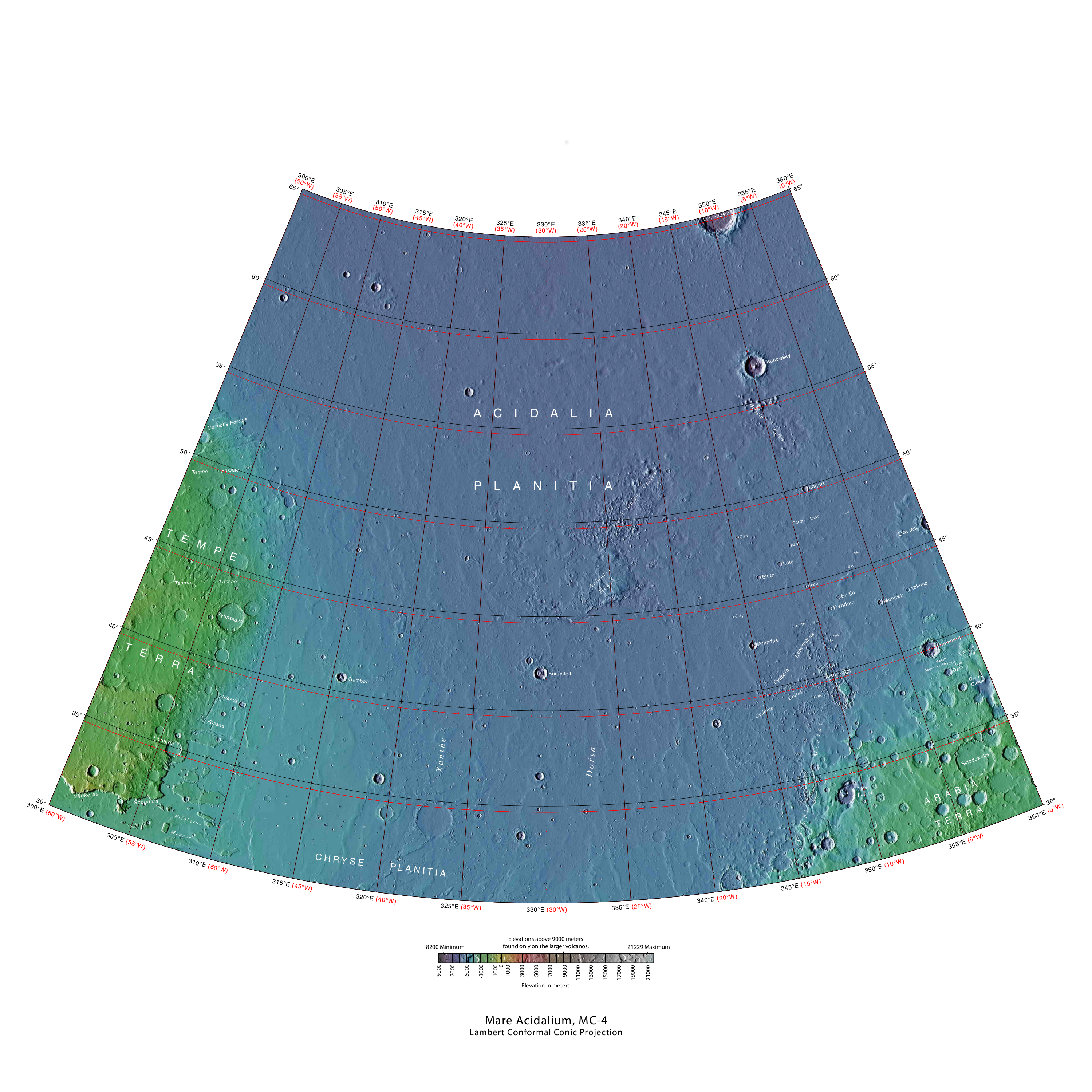
Map of Mare Acidalium quadrangle. Lomonosov and Kunowsky craters are easily seen on the map. The famous "Face on Mars" is located near Cydonia Mensae.

Acidalia Colles is a group of hills in the Mare Acidalium quadrangle of Mars, located at 50.9° north latitude and 23.1° west longitude. It is about 360 km long and was named after a classical albedo feature name. The term "Colles" is used for small hills or knobs. Gullies have been observed on Acidalia Colles.

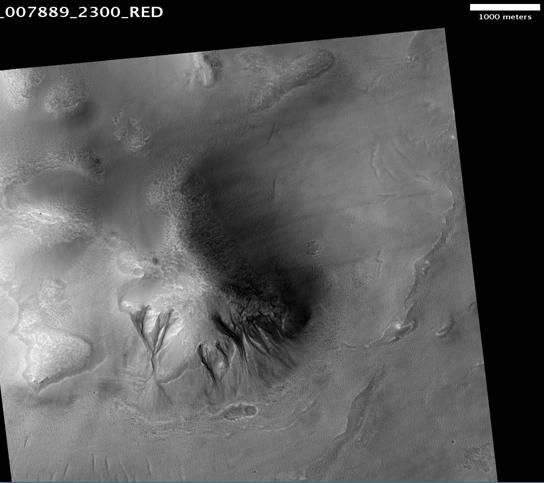
Acidalia Colles gullies and related features. Scale bar is 1,000 m (0.62 mi).
