= Biblis Tholus =

Martian volcano

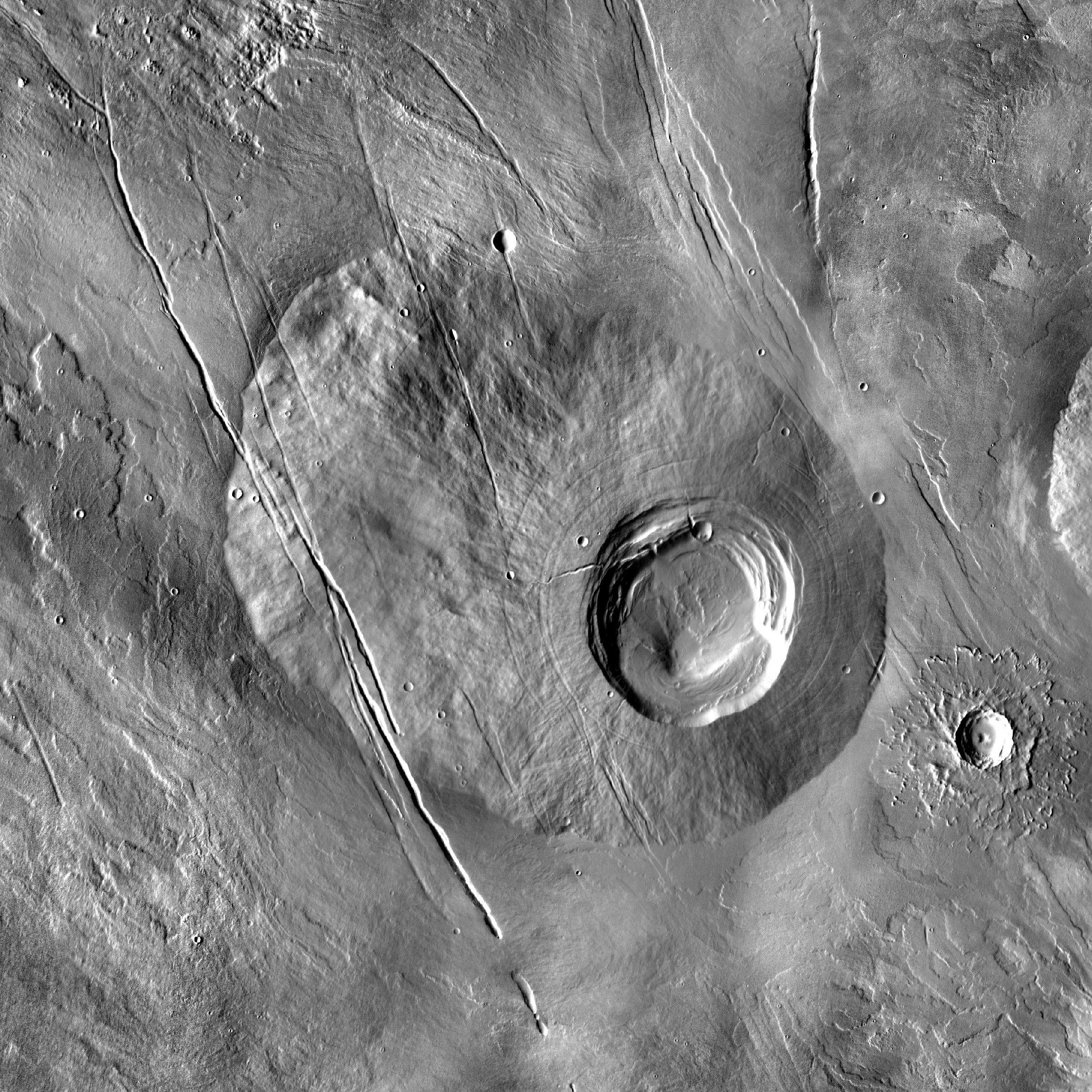
- THEMIS daytime IR mosaic of Biblis Tholus.
- Coordinates: 2.55°N 235.62°E
- Peak: 3 km

Biblis Tholus is an extinct Martian volcano located at 2.55°N 235.62°E, one of two volcanoes near the center of the Tharsis volcanism. Along with Ulysses Tholus, it is almost midway between Olympus Mons and the Tharsis Montes. Biblis Tholus lies in the Tharsis quadrangle. It is approximately 170 kilometers (110 mi) long and 100 kilometers (62 mi) wide, rising about 3 kilometers (1.9 mi) from its surroundings.

In the middle of the volcano is a caldera, named Biblis Patera, believed to have formed as the result of collapse of the magma chamber during eruptions of the volcano. The caldera is 53 kilometers (33 mi) in diameter and four kilometers (2.5 miles) in depth.

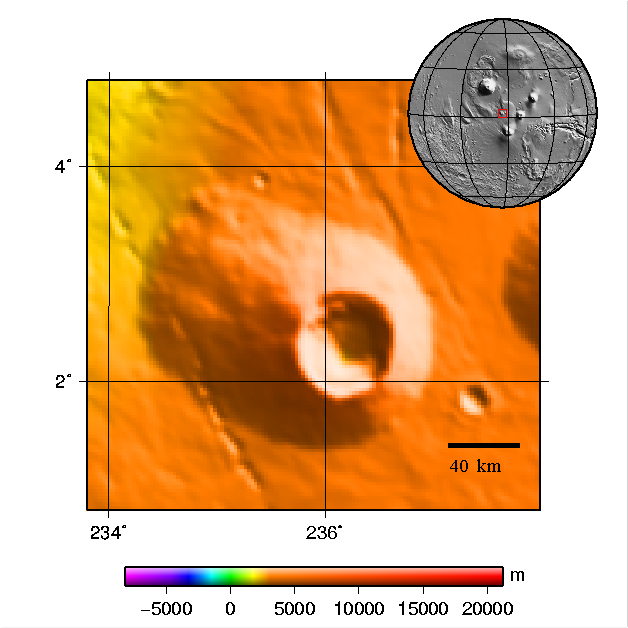
Topography and location in Tharsis using MOLA data set.

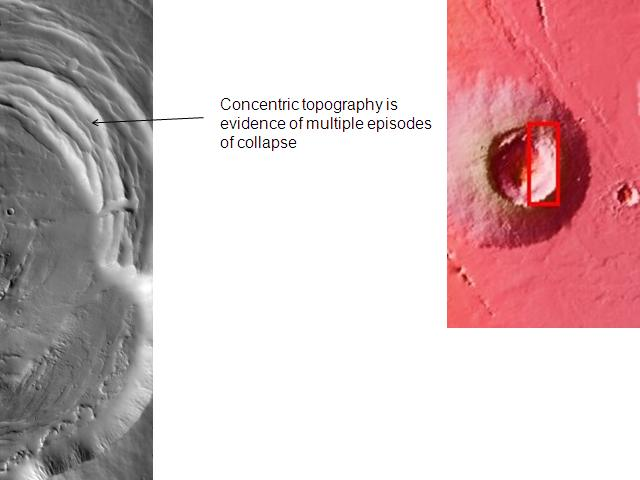
Close-up of Biblis Patera taken with Mars Odyssey. Rim of crater shows multiple episodes of collapse.

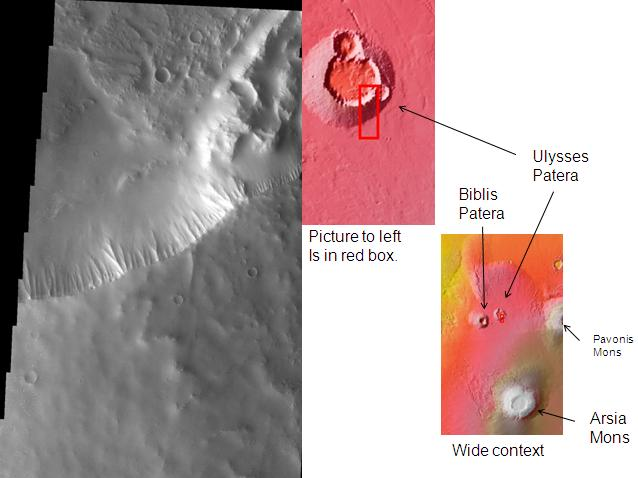
Nearby Ulysses Tholus, showing its location in relation to other volcanoes (photo by THEMIS).

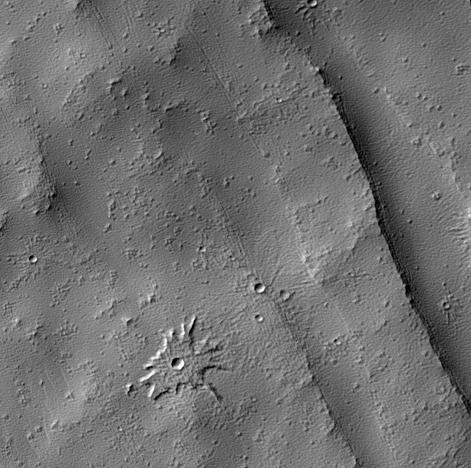
Biblis Patera pedestal crater, as seen by HiRISE.

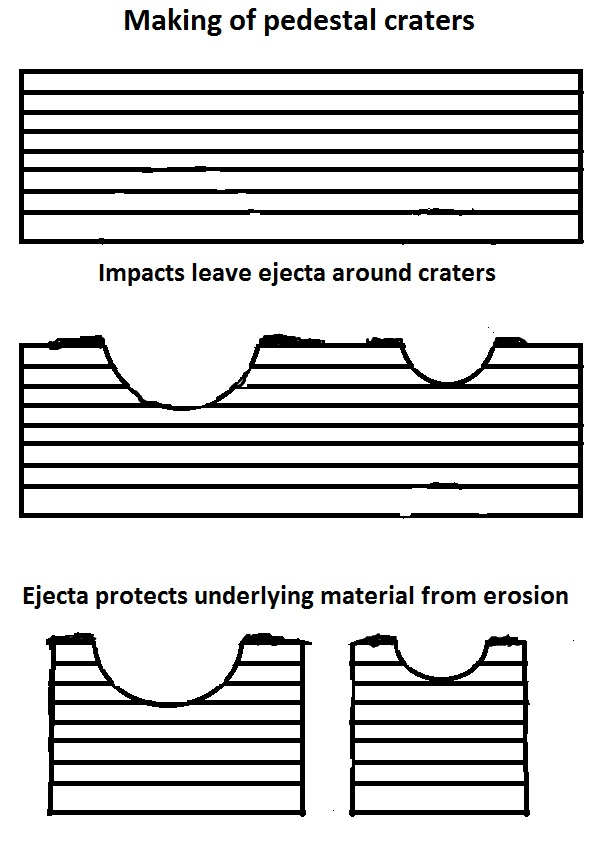
Pedestal craters form when the ejecta from impacts protect the underlying material from erosion. As a result of this process, craters appear perched above their surroundings.

== See also ==
- Geography of Mars
- HiRISE
- Geology of Mars
- List of mountains on Mars by height
- Pedestal crater
- Volcanoes on Mars
- Volcanology of Mars
