= Aganippe Fossa =

Surface feature on Mars

Aganippe Fossa as seen by THEMIS.

Aganippe Fossa is a fossa (surface feature) on Mars in the Phoenicis Lacus quadrangle. It is a graben that stretches around 600 km (370 mi). It is named after a classical albedo feature. It was first spotted in 1930, and officially named in 1976. The name Aganippe is a reference to its location at the base of a volcano. How it came to be is a subject of debate, with the geomorphology indicating it likely developed due to a collapse of lava tubes underneath. Tectonic movement, specifically glaciation, had previously been suggested.

Aganippe Fossa runs from 4.1° to 13° south latitude and 124.9° to 126.9° west longitude. It is one of the many dark slope streaks that are common on Mars. It is located near the base of the volcano Arsia Mons. Images captured in December 2023 show by the European Space Agency show both hummocky and lobate terrain.

== See also ==
- Valles Marineris
- Geology of Mars
