= Mount Helicon =

Mountain in Greece

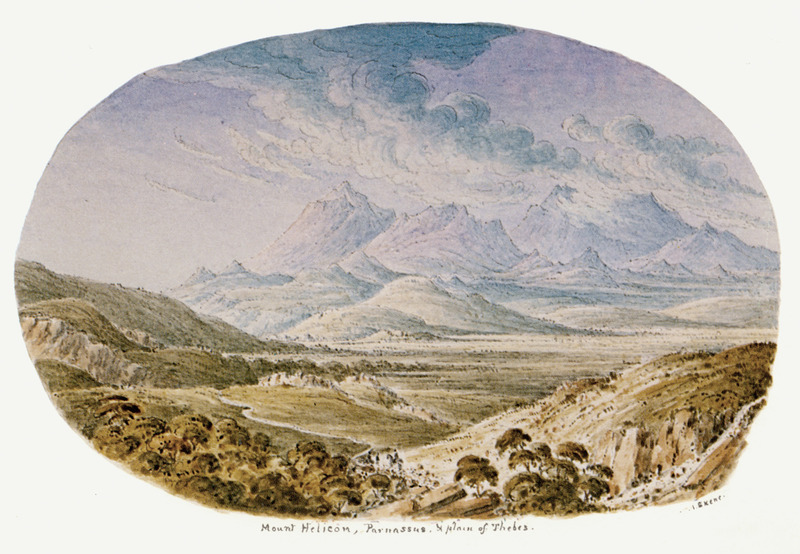
- Mount Helicon, Parnassus and the plain of Thebes (c. 1838–1845) by Skene James

Highest point
- Elevation: 1,749 m (5,738 ft)
- Coordinates: 38°21′10″N 22°49′21″E

Geography
- Location within Greece
- Location: Boeotia, Greece
- Parent range: Helicon

Mount Helicon (Ancient Greek: Ἑλικών; Greek: Ελικώνας) is a mountain in the region of Thespiai in Boeotia, Greece, celebrated in Greek mythology. With an altitude of 1,749 metres (5,738 ft), it is located approximately 10 kilometres (6 mi) from the north coast of the Gulf of Corinth. Some researchers maintain that Helicon was also the Greek name of mount Rocca Salvatesta in Sicily as a river started from it was also called Helikon.

== Greek mythology ==
In Greek mythology, two springs sacred to the Muses were located here: the Aganippe and the Hippocrene, both of which bear "horse" (ἵππος híppos) in their names. In a related myth, the Hippocrene spring was created when the winged horse Pegasus aimed his hoof at a rock, striking it with such force that the spring burst from the spot. On Mount Helicon too was the spring where Narcissus was inspired by his own beauty.

Mount Helicon and the Hippocrene spring were considered to be a source of poetic inspiration. In the late eighth or early seventh century BCE, the poet Hesiod placed a reference to the muses on the Helicon at the very beginning of his Theogony:

μουσάων Ἑλικωνιάδων ἀρχώμεθ᾽ ἀείδειν, αἵθ᾽ Ἑλικῶνος ἔχουσιν ὄρος μέγα τε ζάθεόν τε καί τε περὶ κρήνην ἰοειδέα πόσσ᾽ ἁπαλοῖσιν ὀρχεῦνται καὶ βωμὸν ἐρισθενέος Κρονίωνος. καί τε λοεσσάμεναι τέρενα χρόα Περμησσοῖο ἢ Ἵππου κρήνης ἢ Ὀλμειοῦ ζαθέοιο ἀκροτάτῳ Ἑλικῶνι χοροὺς ἐνεποιήσαντο καλούς, ἱμερόεντας: ἐπερρώσαντο δὲ ποσσίν.	From the Heliconian Muses let us begin to sing, Who hold the great and holy mount of Helicon, And dance on soft feet about the deep-blue spring And the altar of the almighty son of Cronos, and, When they have washed their tender bodies in Permessus Or in the Horse's Spring or Olmeius, Make their fair, lovely dances upon highest Helicon And move with vigorous feet.

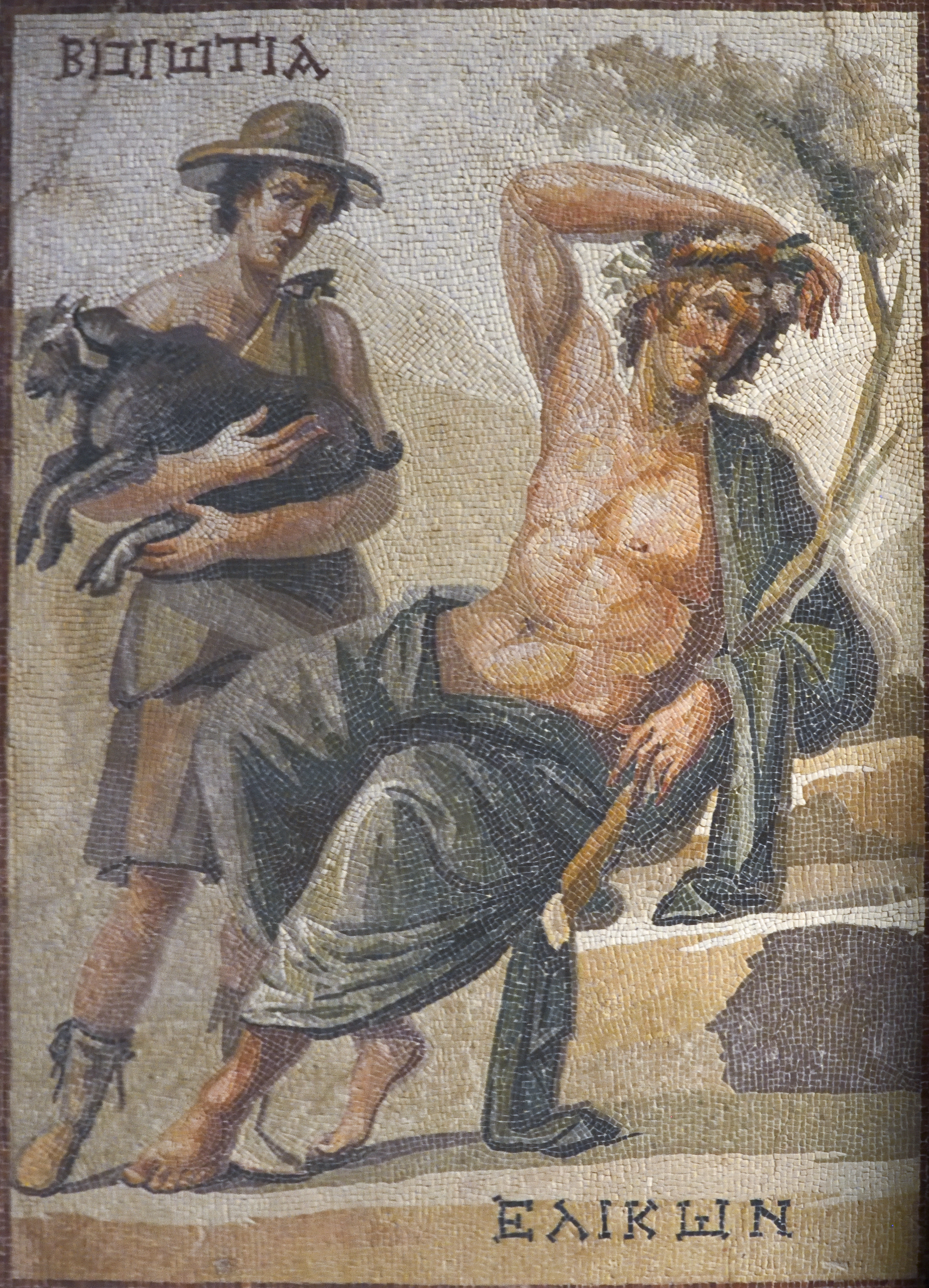
Roman mosaic with personifications of Boeotia and Mount Helicon from Antioch.

Later in the text, he describes a meeting between himself and the Muses on Mount Helicon, where he had been pasturing sheep when the goddesses presented him with a laurel staff, a symbol of poetic authority. The Helicon thus was an emblem of poetical inspiration. (It is not clear, if the other names mentioned – Permessus and Olmeius – are different springs or other names for Hippocrene.) In the Homeric Hymn to Poseidon – generally dated to the seventh century, but a bit later than Hesiod's works – a brief invocation, the god is hailed as "Lord of Helicon".

In his Aitia, the third-century BC poet Callimachus recounts his dream in which he was young once more and conversed with the Muses on Helicon. and thus follows explicitly in the footsteps of Hesiod. He also placed on Helicon the episode in which Tiresias stumbles upon Athena bathing and is blinded but at the same time given the art of prophecy, by which means poetry and prophecy are implicitly connected to each other. Perhaps reflecting this account, the Roman poet Ovid, in his Metamorphoses, writes of Minerva visiting the muses on Mount Helicon.

The cult centers on Helicon established in the Valley of the Muses, a fertile valley near Thespiai and Ascra, under the influence of the Hesiodic texts, in Hellenistic times if not before, were visited by Pausanias in the second century CE. He explored the sacred grove by the spring Aganippe thoroughly and left a full description as it then was. He saw images of Eupheme, nurse of the Muses, and of the legendary poet Linus "in a small rock which has been worked into the manner of a cave" (cf. the religious use of grottoes). In the temenos were statues, some by famous masters, of Apollo and Dionysus and famed poets. The absence of Homer at Helicon has been noticed by Richard Hunter: "The presence of Homer would spoil the party, for the tendency to see these as rival figures for supremacy in epos is familiar from the Contest of Homer and Hesiod, parts of which derive from the classical period". But even if the presence of Homer at the festival Hesiod mentions in Works and Days (650–59) was a later interpolation, the sacrificial tripod which Hesiod won at a contest in Chalcis in Euboea was still on view at Helicon in Pausanias' day.

== Since the Renaissance ==
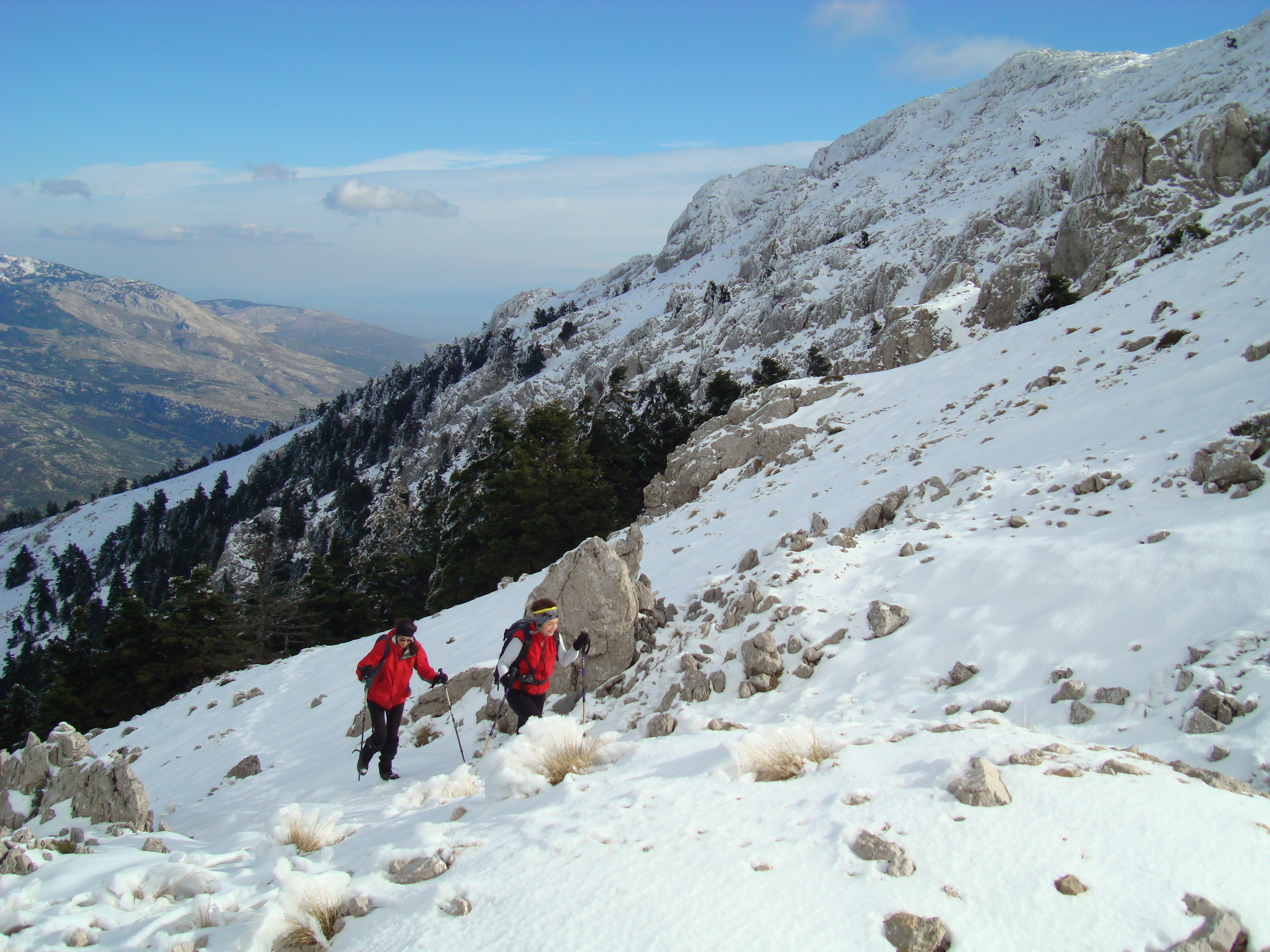
Hikers ascending the slopes of Helicon

The poetical image of Helicon established by the Roman poets became once more an emblem of cultural inspiration with the Renaissance and is often referred to in poetry. The Hungarian composer Leó Festetics (1800–1884) held 'Helicon balls' at his Festetics Palace near Keszthely (whose Slavic place name suggests the Hungarian equivalent hely), also naming the library he founded the Helikon Library. John Milton, in Paradise Lost, refers to Mount Helicon as "th'Aonian mount" at the very beginning (line 15) of the poem. Torquato Tasso refers to "Elicona" in the second verse of "Gerusalemme Liberata".

== Religious sites ==
The monastery of Hosios Loukas, a UNESCO World Heritage Site, is located on Mount Helicon.

== Sources ==
- Richard Hunter, The Shadow of Callimachus: Studies in the Reception of Hellenistic Poetry at Rome (Cambridge University Press) 2006:16ff "De Monte Sororum: In the Grove".
