= Olmeius =

River in Greece

The Olmeius or Olmeios (Ancient Greek: Ὀλμειός) was a stream rising in Mount Helicon, which, after uniting with the Permessus, flowed into Lake Copais near Haliartus. William Martin Leake, visiting the site in the 19th century, regarded the Kefalári as the Permessus, and the river of Zagará (modern Evangelistria] as the Olmeius.
