= Arsia Chasmata =

Martian geographical feature

- Arsia Chasmata based on THEMIS day-time image
- Coordinates: 7.6°S 119.3°W
- Length: 97 km

Arsia Chasmata is a steep-sided depression located northeast of Arsia Mons in the Phoenicis Lacus quadrangle on Mars, located at 7.6° S and 119.3° W. It is 97 km long and was named after an albedo name.

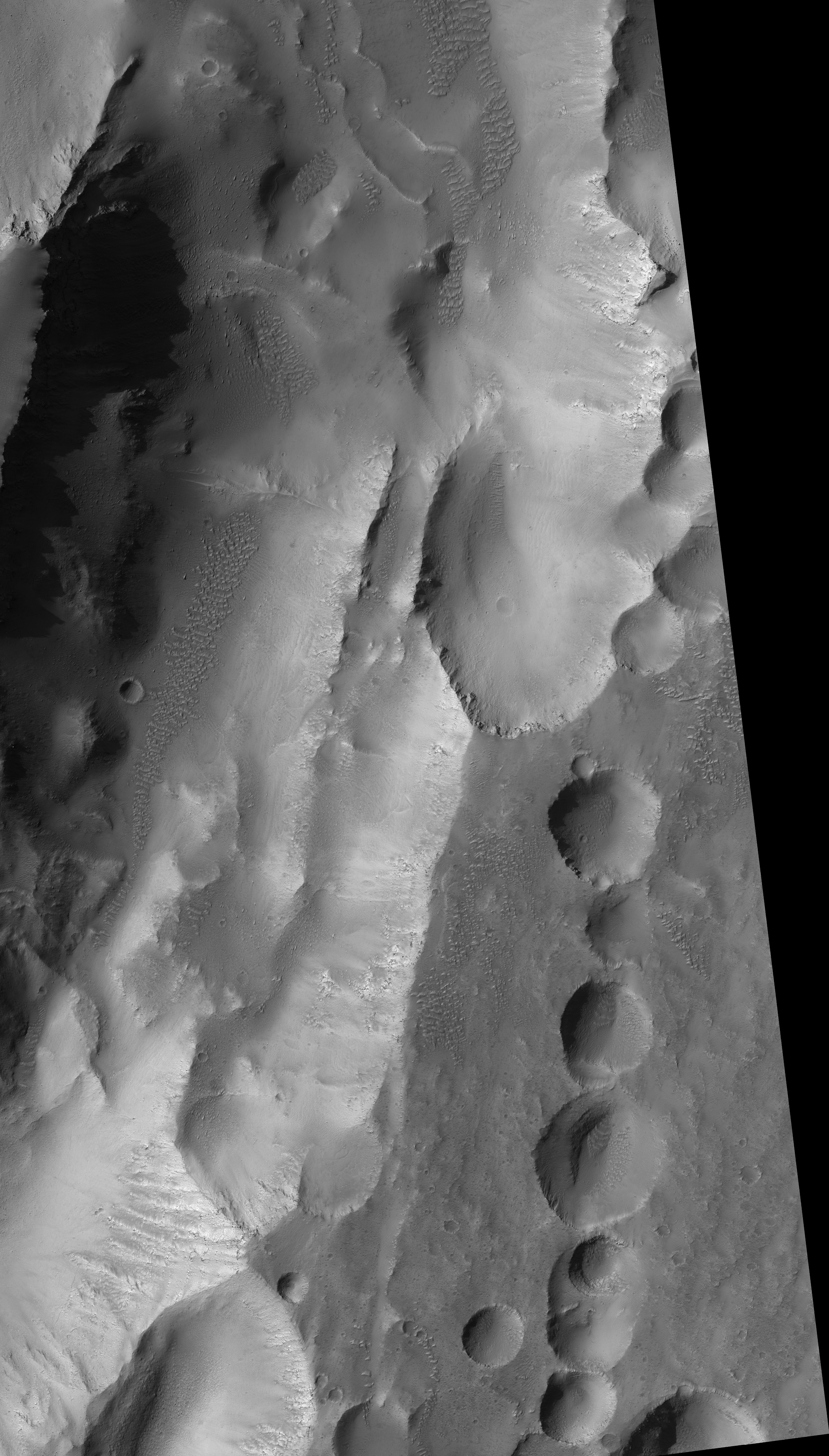
Arsia Chasmata, as seen by HiRISE. A pit crater chain is visible in the lower right.

In planetary geology, a chasma (plural: chasmata) is a deep, elongated, steep-sided depression.

== See also ==
- Chasma
- Geology of Mars
- HiRISE
