= Tractus Catena =

Crater on Mars

- Tractus Catena based on THEMIS day-time image
- Coordinates: 28.17°N 102.77°W

Tractus Catena is a set of pits in the Arcadia quadrangle of Mars. Its location is centered at 28.17°N 102.77°W . It is 897 km (557 mi) long and was named after a classical albedo feature name. The term "Catena" refers to a chain of craters.

The line of pits that make up Tractus Catena make it related to fossa which are common on Mars.

Dark slope streaks are visible in one of the pictures below. Such streaks are common on Mars. They occur on steep slopes of craters, troughs, and valleys. The streaks are dark at first. They get lighter with age. Sometimes they start in a tiny spot, then spread out and go for hundreds of meters. They have been seen to travel around obstacles, like boulders. It is believed that they are avalanches of bright dust that expose a darker underlying layer.

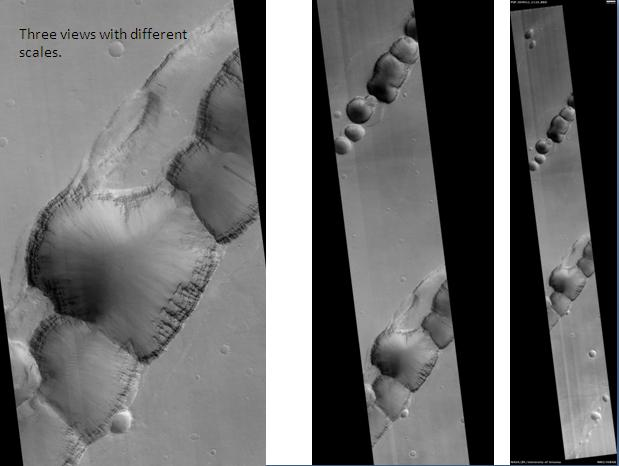
Tractus Catena, as seen by HiRISE. Scale bar is 1,000 m (3,300 ft) long. Click on image for good view of dark slope streaks

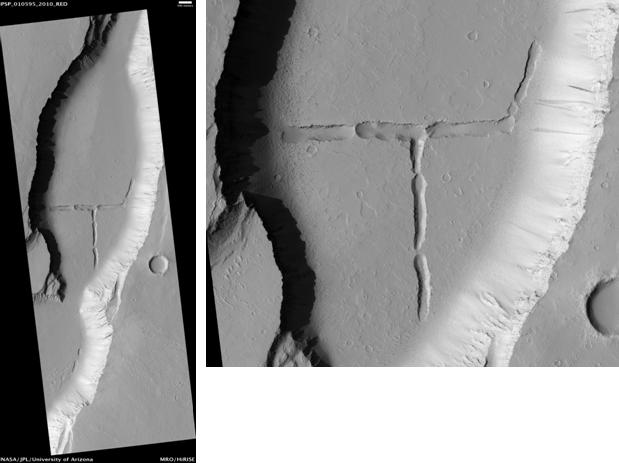
Tractus Catena Floor, as seen by HiRISE. Scale bar is 500 m (1,600 ft) long.

== See also ==
- Dark Slope Streaks
- Fossa (geology)
- Geology of Mars
- HiRISE
