= Artynia =

Artynia or Aphnitis was the name of a swamp or lake of Asia Minor mentioned by ancient geographers.

Its exact identity is uncertain. The identification of Artynia with Aphnitis is due to Stephanus of Byzantium. Pliny places Artynia near Miletupolis, having the Rhyndacus river flow through it, so that Pliny's Artynia can be said to correspond to Aboulliond. Strabo mentions three lakes of Cyzicene, naming them after nearby cities: Lake Dascylitis near Dascylium, Miletopolitis near Miletupolis, and Apolloniatis near Apollonia. Lake Dascylitis is also given the name of Aphnitis.

== See also ==
- Cyzicus
