= Artynia Catena =

Crater on Mars

- Artynia Catena based on THEMIS day-time image
- Location: Mars
- Coordinates: 47.97°N 119.67°W
- Eponym: a classical albedo feature

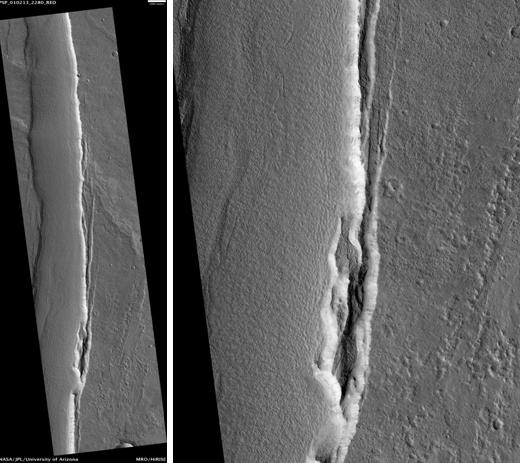
Artynia Catena, as seen by HiRISE. Scale bar is 1,000 m (3,300 ft) long.

Artynia Catena is a catena in the Arcadia quadrangle of Mars, located around northwest of Alba Mons at 47.97°N 119.67°W. It is 263 km (163 mi) long and was named after a classical albedo feature at 54°N 137°W, which was accepted by the IAU in the year 1985. The term "Catena" refers to a chain of craters.

It is believed to be formed from the Martian surface collapsing into the underground cavities, such as ancient, emptied lava tubes.
