= Aganippe =

Name or epithet of several figures in Greek mythology

Aganippe (/æɡəˈnɪpiː/; Ancient Greek: Ἀγανίππη, romanized: Aganíppē, lit. 'mare who kills mercifully') was a name or epithet of several figures in Greek mythology:

- Aganippe, a naiad of the spring Aganippe.
- Aganippe, wife of King Acrisius of Argos, and according to some accounts the mother of Danaë and possibly Evarete. Although in some accounts, Eurydice was wife of Acrisius and the mother of Danae.
- Aganippe, an aspect of Demeter. In this form she was a black winged horse worshiped by certain cults. In this aspect her idols (such as one found in Mavrospelya, the Black Cave, in Phigalia) she was portrayed as mare-headed with a mane entwined with Gorgon Snakes. This aspect was also associated with Anion (or Arion) whom Heracles rode, who later inspired tales of Pegasus.

Aganippis, a name used by Ovid in his Fasti as an epithet of Hippocrene; its meaning however is not quite clear. It is derived from Aganippe, the well or nymph, and as "Aganippides" is used to designate the Muses, Aganippis Hippocrene may mean nothing more than "Hippocrene, sacred to the Muses".

== Namesake ==
Aganippe, a genus of trapdoor spiders
