= Permessus =

Ancient stream in Greece that flowed from Mount Helicon into Lake Copais

The Permessus or Permessos (Ancient Greek: Περμησσός) was a stream rising in Mount Helicon, which, after uniting with the Olmeius, flowed into Lake Copais near Haliartus. William Martin Leake, visiting the site in the 19th century, regarded the Kefalári as the Permessus, and the river of Zagará as the Olmeius.

This river, apparently sacred to Apollo (patron deity of poets), is referred to in Propertius' poem (2.10.25-6) to Augustus, 'Nondum etenim Ascraeos norunt mea carmina fontes, Sed modo Permessi flumine lavit Amor.' The Permessus is also mentioned in Hesiod's Theogony, which describes the Muses using the river to bathe in line 5, "And having bathed their silken skin in Permessos."
