= Alba (disambiguation) =

Alba is the Scottish Gaelic name for Scotland.

Alba or ALBA may also refer to:

== Arts, entertainment and media ==
=== Fictional characters ===
- Alba (Darkstalkers), in the Japanese video game
- Alba (The Time Traveler's Wife), in the novel by Audrey Niffenegger
- Alba Meira, in the Japanese video game series King of Fighters
- Alba Trueba, in the novel The House of the Spirits by Chilean author Isabel Allende
- Quercus Alba, in the video game Ace Attorney Investigations: Miles Edgeworth

=== Video games ===
- Alba: A Wildlife Adventure, a 2020 game developed by Ustwo Games

=== Films and television ===
- Alba (film), a 2016 Ecuadorian film
- BBC Alba, a Scottish Gaelic language digital television channel from the BBC
- Alba (TV series), a Spanish drama television series

=== Literature ===
- Alba (novel), 1985, Daniel Odier
- Alba (poetry), a genre of Occitan poetry

=== Music ===
- Alba (Danish music ensemble)
- Alba Musica Kyo, a group founded by Toyohiko Satoh
- "Alba", a song by Runrig from their 1987 album The Cutter and the Clan
- Alba (Allbina Bolatqyzy Nazarbayeva), a Kazakh singer signed under Juz Entertainment
- Alba (Ultimo album), 2023
  - "Alba" (Ultimo song), 2023

== Businesses and organizations ==
=== Brands and enterprises ===
- Alba (electronics brand), a former British consumer electronics brand and manufacturing company
- Alba (watch), a sub-brand of Seiko Watch Corporation
- ALBA, an American milk products company owned by the Hain Celestial Group
- Alba Engineering, an Italian motor racing company co-founded by Giorgio Stirano
- Alba Vineyard, a winery in New Jersey
- Aluminium Bahrain, or AlBa, an aluminum producer in Bahrain

=== Schools and universities ===
- ALBA Graduate Business School, a Greek academic institution
- Lebanese Academy of Fine Arts, (French: Académie Libanaise des Beaux-Arts (ALBA))

=== Other organisations ===
- Alba Party, a Scottish political party
- ALBA, formally Bolivarian Alliance for the Peoples of Our America, an intergovernmental organization
- Autogestión Liberadora Buenos Aires, an Argentinian political party
- Operation Alba, a multinational peacekeeping force sent to Albania in 1997

== People ==
- Alba (given name)
- Alba (surname)

== Places ==
=== Italy ===
- Alba, Piedmont, a comune in the province of Cuneo
- Alba Adriatica, a comune in the province of Teramo, Abruzzo
- Alba Fucens, an ancient town in the province of L'Aquila, Abruzzo
- Alba Longa, an ancient city in the province of Rome, Lazio
- Baldissero d'Alba, a comune in the province of Cuneo, Piedmont
- Diano d'Alba, a comune in the province of Cuneo, Piedmont
- Morro d'Alba, comune in the province of Ancona, Marche
- Republic of Alba, a French revolutionary municipality in Piedmont, 1798
- Republic of Alba (1944), a short-lived state in Piedmont
- Serralunga d'Alba, a comune in the province of Cuneo, Piedmont
- Vezza d'Alba, a comune in the province of Cuneo, Piedmont

=== New Zealand ===
- Mount Alba, a mountain in the Southern Alps

=== Romania ===
- Alba County, a county in Transylvania
- Alba Iulia, a city in Alba County, Transylvania
- Alba, a village in Hudeşti Commune, Botoşani County
- Alba, a village in Izvoarele Commune, Tulcea County
- Alba (Șușița), a tributary of the Șușița in Vrancea County

=== Spain ===
- Alba, Aragon, a municipio in the province of Teruel
- Alba de Cerrato, a municipio in the province of Palencia
- Alba de Tormes, a municipio in the province of Salamanca, Castile and León
- Alba de Yeltes, a municipio in the province of Salamanca, Castile and León
- Alba (Nalón), a tributary of the Nalón in the Redes Natural Park in Asturias

=== Ukraine ===
- Cetatea Alba, a former Romanian name of Bilhorod-Dnistrovskyi, a city and port
- Fântâna Albă, now Bila Krynytsia, a village in the Stary Vovchynets commune
- Snake Island (Black Sea), known as Alba to the Romans

=== United States ===
- Alba, Michigan, an unincorporated community in Antrim County
- Alba, Missouri, a city in Jasper County
- Alba, Pennsylvania, a borough in Bradford County
- Alba, Texas, a town divided between Wood County and Rains County
- Alba Township, Henry County, Illinois
- Alba Township, Jackson County, Minnesota

== Science and technology ==
=== Biology ===
- A. alba (disambiguation), various species
- Alba (rabbit), a genetically modified glowing rabbit
- Alba (orangutan), wild orangutan noted for albinism
- Bergenia stracheyi 'Alba', a cultivar of an Asian plant
- Salvia officinalis 'Alba', a white-flowered cultivar of sage
- Alba Cinnamon, a grade of Sri Lankan Cinnamomum verum
- Tyto alba, the common barn owl
- Cattleya elongata f. alba, a Brazilian orchid variety
- Ectophylla alba, a species of bat in Central America
- Isotheca alba, a species of flowering plants belonging to the family Acanthaceae
- Linea alba (abdomen), Latin for white line, a fibrous structure that runs down the midline of the abdomen in humans and other vertebrates
- Linea alba (cheek), Latin for white line, in dentistry refers to a horizontal streak on the buccal mucosa (inner surface of the cheek)
- Quercus alba, the white oak, a species of tree
- S. alba (disambiguation), various species
- Ulmus × hollandica 'Alba', a hybrid elm tree

=== Other uses in Sciences ===
- ALBA (synchrotron), a Spanish synchrotron radiation facility
- Alba Mons, a volcano on Mars
- ALBA-1, a submarine communications cable between Cuba and Venezuela

== Sport ==
- Alba (shinty team), a Scottish composite rules shinty–hurling team
- Alba Berlin, a German basketball club
- S.C. Alba, a Portuguese football club

== Transportation ==
=== Motor vehicles ===
- Alba (1907 automobile), an Austrian vintage car
- Alba (1913 automobile), a French vintage car
- Alba (1952 automobile), a Portuguese car
- Alba (motorcycle), a 1920s German motorcycle

=== Ships ===
- SS Alba, a Panamanian ship wrecked off Cornwall, England, in 1938 and painted by Alfred Wallis
- SS Alba, a Chilean ship wrecked in 1928

== See also ==
- Alb, liturgical vestment in Christian churches
- Albion, oldest name of the island of Great Britain
- Alban (disambiguation)
- Album (disambiguation)
- Albus (disambiguation)
