= Enipeus Vallis =

Vallis on Mars

- Enipeus Vallis, as seen in THEMIS daytime IR mosaic.
- Feature type: valley network
- Location: Arcadia quadrangle
- Coordinates: 36.68°N 266.9°E

Enipeus Vallis is a valley in the northern hemisphere of the planet Mars. It is centered at lat. 37°N, long. 267°E in the Arcadia quadrangle (MC-3) between the large volcano Alba Mons and the Tempe Terra plateau. The valley follows a gently sinuous, north–south path for a distance of about 357 km (222 mi). It is likely an ancient watercourse that formed during the early Hesperian (or late Noachian) period, around 3.7 billion years ago.

The valley is named after a river in Thessaly, Greece. Enipeus is also the name of a river god in classical mythology. The International Astronomical Union (IAU) formally adopted the name Enipeus Vallis in 1991. Vallis is the Latin word for valley.

== General description ==
Enipeus Vallis is mapped as a valley network. Valley networks are branching systems of valleys on Mars that superficially resemble terrestrial river drainage basins. They are abundant in the equatorial and southern highlands of the planet but less common in the northern hemisphere. Most valley networks are thought to have formed by flowing water, although the primary source of the water (melting ice, rainfall, springs) is still debated.

Enipeus Vallis is a single trunk valley, with no large tributaries. The valley is widest (about 10 km or 6.2 mi) at its southernmost reach near Lat. 33.6°N and rapidly tapers northward, maintaining a regular width of 3 to 5 km (1.9 to 3.1 mi) throughout most of its course. Above lat. 39.7°N the valley opens up, and drainage features become poorly integrated and ill-defined. North of this area, a somewhat subdued valley segment continues to the northwest from 40.5°N to about 42.5°N (northwest of the crater Lowbury) where it is locally buried by impact crater ejecta and young (Amazonian-aged) plains material. This northern valley segment gradually loses its identity amid the narrow grabens of Tantalus Fossae.

The elevation of the valley floor ranges from 885 m (2,904 ft) above datum (Mars "sea" level) in the south to 100 m (330 ft) or less in the north, where the northern segment of the valley begins to lose its definition. In cross-sectional profile, the valley is U-shaped to rectangular, with depths ranging from 20 to 50 m (66 to 164 ft). In the south, Enipeus Vallis has levee-like ridges along its edges that are up to 20 m (66 ft) high. The levees are locally breached by lava flows from the surrounding plains.

In places, inner channels are visible along the valley floor. At around 36°N, the channels form an anastomosing (braided) pattern. Near the middle section of the southern valley segment, the valley divides into several branches, which then rejoin to form diamond-shaped islands. Faint longitudinal striations and streamlined erosional bedforms are common all along the floor of the valley. (See Photo Gallery.)

In fluvial geomorphology, a distinction is made between the terms stream valley and stream channel. Stream valleys are wide, elongate depressions. The stream itself flows within the confines of a channel in the center of the valley. A stream valley usually contains many channels. Channels are always much narrower and shallower than the valley that contains them, and water in the stream channel never comes close to filling the entire valley.

The distinction is important when discussing features of probable fluvial origin on Mars. Although Enipeus Vallis is described here as a valley, it has many features typical of a channel, including fluvial bedforms, streamlined features, a U-shaped profile, and levee deposits, which are always associated with channels not valleys. Except for its small width and general sinuosity, Enipeus Vallis has characteristics resembling the immense Martian outflow channels, which are true channels formed by the catastrophic release of large volumes of water. Fluvial landforms like Enipeus Vallis that show characteristics of both valley networks and outflow channels are relatively common on Mars (Ma'adim Vallis, for example). and indicate that fluvial erosion on Mars has a distinctive genesis and evolution compared to Earth.

== Regional geology ==
Enipeus Vallis is located at the western edge of the Tempe Terra plateau in the Tempe-Mareotis region. The region lies on a broad topographic shelf bounded by the higher elevations of Alba Mons to the west and Tempe Terra to the east. The region slopes gently to the north with a gradient of 0.3° or less. The area is characterized by abundant lava flows, low volcanic shields, and small domes that are part of the Tempe Volcanic Province, a northeastern extension of the Tharsis Montes chain of volcanoes. Although spatially related to the large Tharsis volcanoes, volcanism in the Tempe Volcanic Province has a different eruptive style and has been likened to the basaltic plains volcanism seen in Idaho’s Snake River Plain. This category of volcanic activity is intermediate between flood (plateau) basalts and Hawaiian volcanism.

The region is transected by numerous northeast-trending grabens that form parts of the Tempe, Mareotis, and Tantalus Fossae; these are fracture systems of varying ages that are oriented radially from the Tharsis bulge. The region west of Enipeus Vallis is characterized by Hesperian-aged volcanic flows from Alba Mons. The area to the east consists of fractured and terraced highland plateaus of Noachian age. At the end of the Noachian period, these highland materials underwent an episode of fluvial erosion and resurfacing. Enipeus Vallis probably formed during this fluvial episode.

== Photo gallery ==
Southern end of Enipeus Vallis is about 10 km wide and broadly U-shaped in profile. The western wall of the valley has a straight NE orientation similar to that of fractures in the Noachian plateau materials to the east. This suggests that the valley formed along pre-existing faults. (THEMIS VIS image)

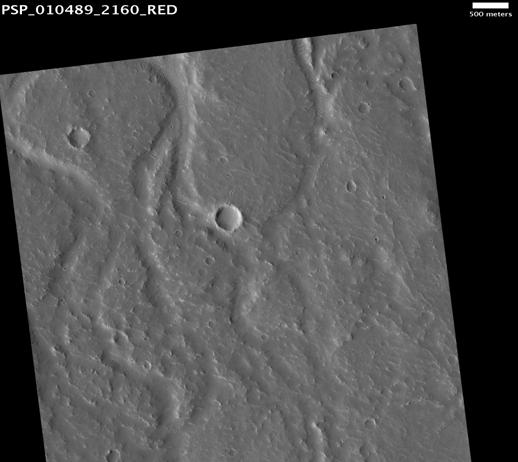
Anastomosing channels in Enipeus Vallis at 35.9°N, 267.0E, as seen in HiRISE image.

Enipeus Vallis (right). Note inner channel, levee-like deposits, and streamlined bedforms. (THEMIS VIS image)

Middle portion of Enipeus Vallis. The valley divides into several channels, forming large central island at 37.0°N, 267.2°E. Image is THEMIS VIS mosaic.

== See also ==
- Geology of Mars
- HiRISE
- Outflow channels
- Vallis (planetary geology)
- Valley network (Mars)
- Water on Mars
