= Ceraunius Fossae =

Set of fractures in the northern Tharsis region of Mars

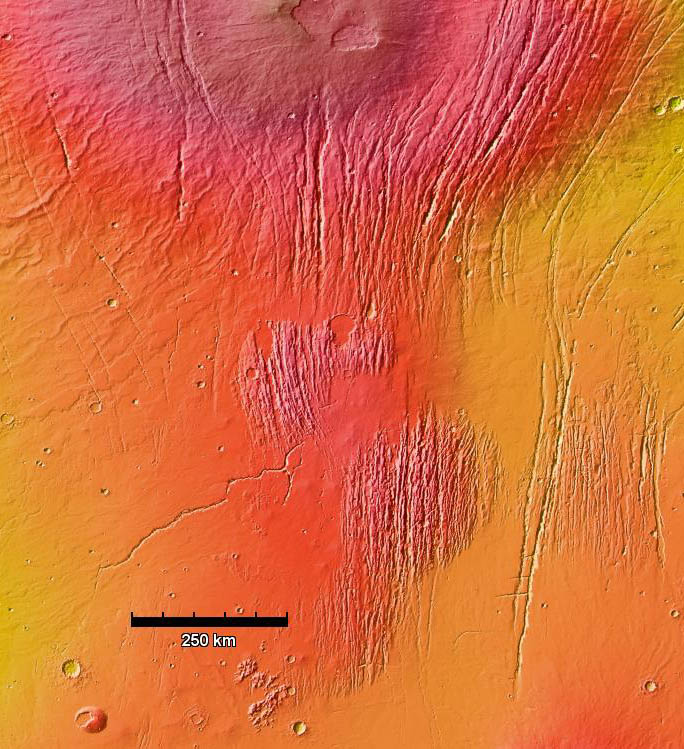
- MOLA colorized image of the Ceraunius Fossae region. The fractured terrain consists of two large patches of north-south trending faults surrounded by lava flows. The Alba Mons volcano is the large, circular feature at top.
- Feature type: Fracture system
- Location: Tharsis quadrangle
- Coordinates: 29.2°N 251°E
- Discoverer: Mariner 9

The Ceraunius Fossae are a set of fractures in the northern Tharsis region of Mars. They lie directly south of the large volcano Alba Mons and consist of numerous parallel faults and tension cracks that deform the ancient highland crust. In places, younger lava flows cover the fractured terrain, dividing it into several large patches or islands. They are found in the Tharsis quadrangle.

The faults are mainly narrow, north–south oriented graben. Graben (the name is both singular and plural) are long, narrow troughs bound by two inward-facing normal faults that enclose a downfaulted block of crust. The graben in the Ceraunius Fossae are commonly several kilometers wide, between 100 and slightly over 1000 m deep, and very closely spaced, giving the terrain a rugged ridge and groove topography. Many of the graben are hundreds of kilometers long and have walls with complex scalloped segments. Some contain pit crater chains (catenae) at their bottoms, suggesting the presence of deep-seated tension cracks into which surface material has drained.

== Name ==
The term Ceraunius is from an albedo feature at lat. 19.78°N, long. 267°E. It was named by Greek Astronomer E. M. Antoniadi in 1930 for the Ceraunian Mountains on the coast of Epirus, Greece (now southwestern Albania). Fossa (pl. fossae) is Latin for ditch and is a descriptor term used in planetary geology for a long, narrow depression or trench. The International Astronomical Union (IAU) formally adopted the term Ceraunius Fossae in 1973. The name Ceraunius Fossae is plural and translates into "the Ceraunian trenches".

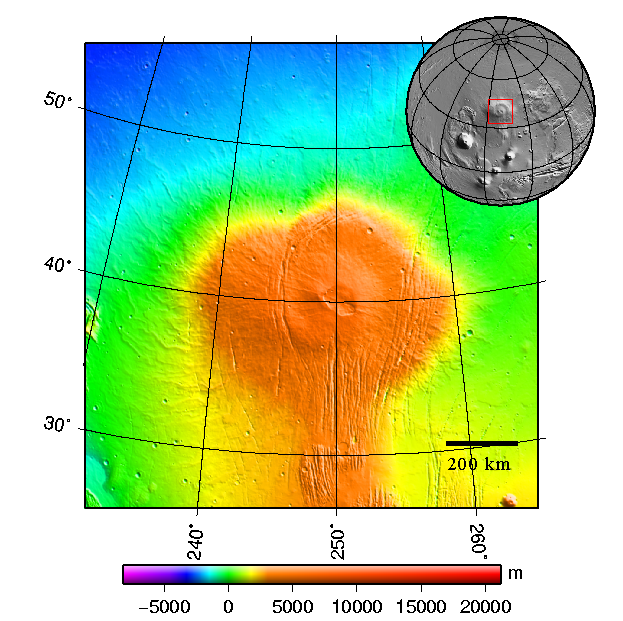
Location and regional topography of Alba Mons and the Ceraunius Fossae. The Ceraunius rise is the narrow orange area extending southward from Alba Mons like a handle (MOLA).

== Location and size ==
Most of the Ceraunius Fossae are located in the northern Tharsis quadrangle. A portion extend northward into the southwestern part of the Arcadia quadrangle where the fossae diverge around the flanks of Alba Mons to form the Alba and Tantalus Fossae systems. The area stretches from lat. 18.9° to 38°N and from long. 247° to 255°E. The entire feature has a north–south length of 1137 km.

The Ceraunius Fossae lie on a broad topographic ridge up to 1.5 km high, called the Ceraunius rise. The ridge projects from the southern edge of Alba Mons and extends southward for a distance of over 1000 km. The southern half of the Alba Mons volcano is built over the northern extension of this ridge.

== Geology ==
The Ceraunius Fossae are tectonic features indicating stresses in the planet's lithosphere. The fractures form when the stresses exceed the yield strength of rock, resulting in deformation of surface materials. Typically, this deformation is manifested as slip on faults that are recognizable in images from orbit. Most of the tectonic features in the western hemisphere of Mars are explained by crustal deformation from the Tharsis bulge (a huge volcanic mass up to 7 km high that covers nearly a quarter of the planet's surface). Among the processes proposed to explain the tectonic features associated with Tharsis are domal uplifting, magmatic intrusion, and volcanic loading (deformation due to the large, sagging weight of the volcanic mass).

The Ceraunius Fossae fractures are extensional features produced when the crust is stretched apart. The fractures are oriented north–south, radial to an early center of volcano-tectonic activity in Syria Planum, a region in southern Tharsis. A large number of extensional structures, including graben and rifts, radiate outward from the center of Tharsis. Mechanical studies indicate that a regional pattern of radiating graben and rifts is consistent with stresses caused by loading of the lithosphere by the enormous weight of the Tharsis bulge. The immense Valles Marineris is probably the best known example of a rift system that lies radial to Tharsis. Several generations of grabens with slightly different orientations are present in Ceraunius Fossae, indicating that stress fields have changed somewhat over time.

Southern part of Ceraunius Fossae based on THEMIS day-time image

In addition to producing normal faults and graben, extensional stresses can produce dilatant fractures or tension cracks that can open up subsurface voids. When surface material slides into the void, a pit crater may form. Pit craters are distinguishable from impact craters in lacking raised rims and surrounding ejecta blankets. On Mars, individual pit craters can coalesce to form crater chains (catenae) or troughs with scalloped edges.

Evidence also exists that some of the graben and crater chains in the Ceraunius Fossae may have been formed by the intrusion of magma, which forms large underground dikes. The migration of the magma exploits or opens up fractures in the subsurface, causing a crack or pit crater chain to form at the surface.

Knowledge of the locations and formation mechanisms of pit craters and fossae is important for the future colonization of Mars because subsurface fractures may act as conduits or reservoirs for water and ice.

== Photo gallery ==
Map of Tharsis quadrangle with major features indicated. The Ceraunius Fossae are in the upper right.

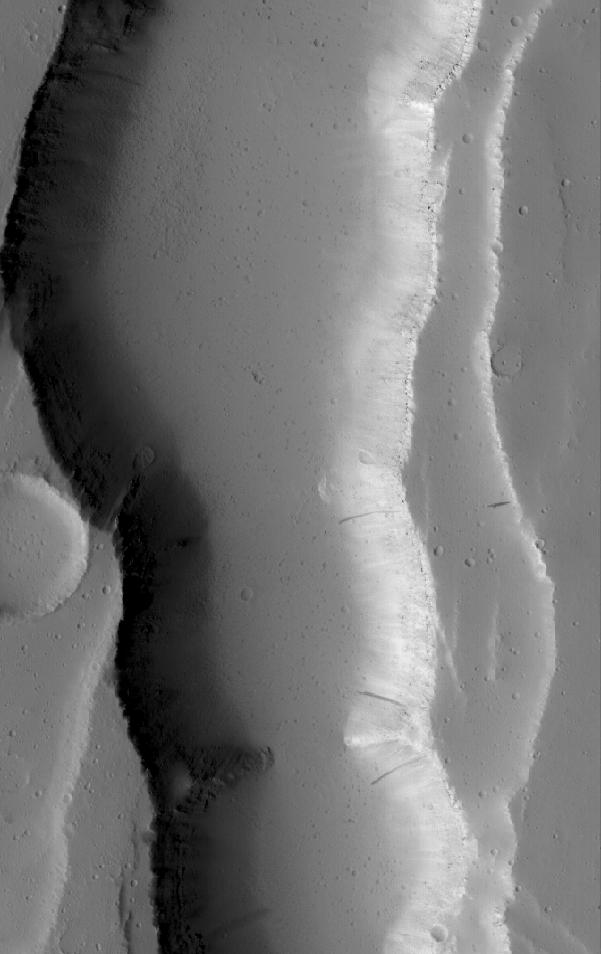
Graben in the Ceraunius Fossae, as seen by Mars Global Surveyor MOC. Note dark slope streaks.

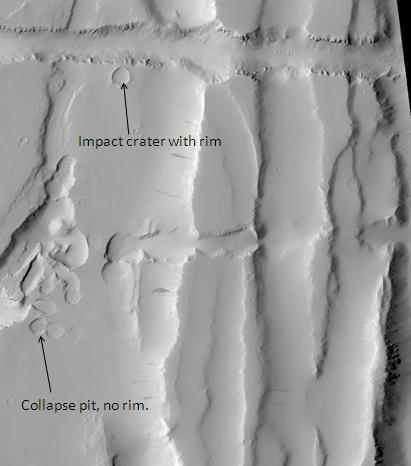
The Ceraunius Fossae, as seen by HiRISE.

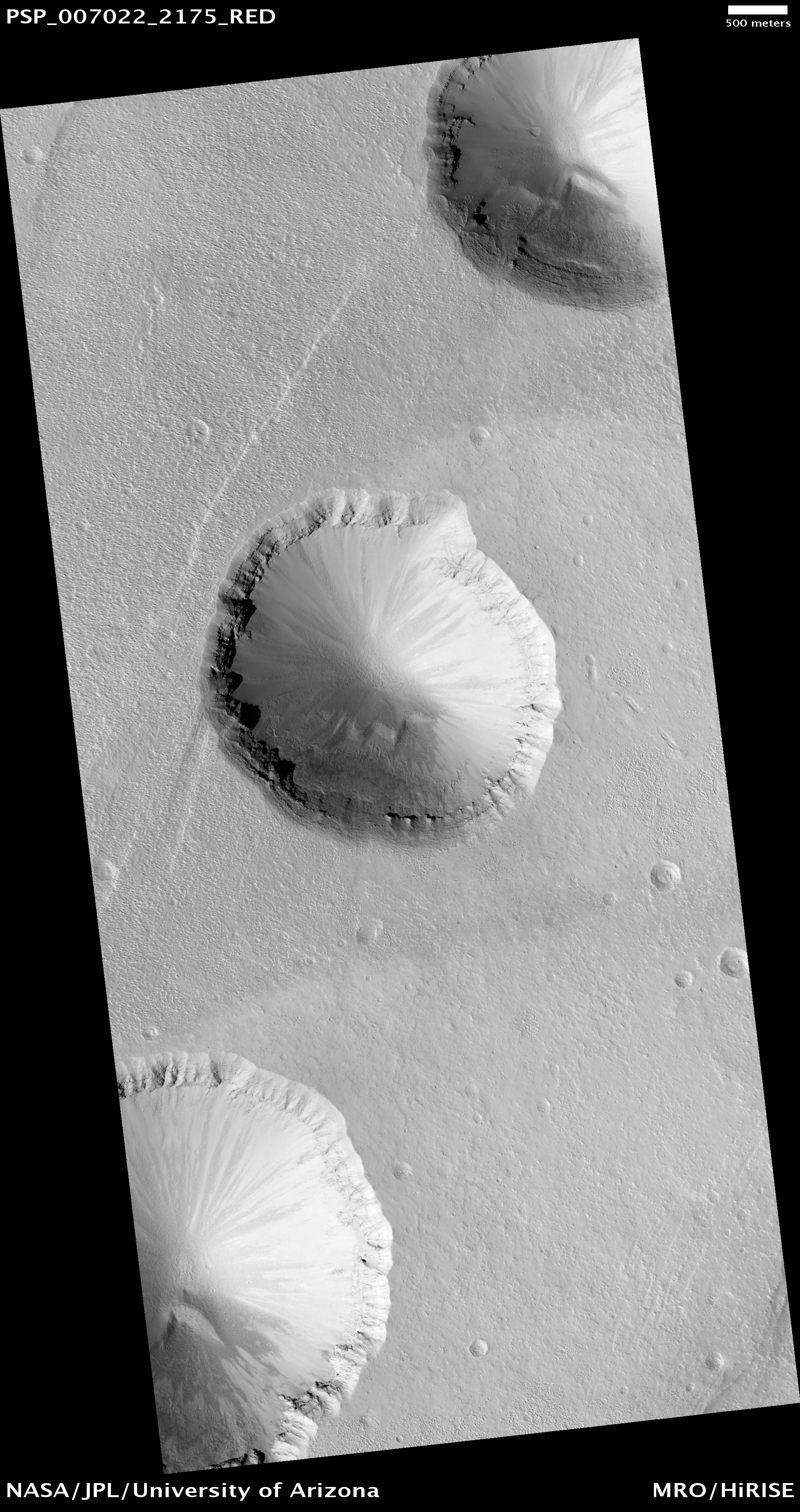
Pit crater chain in Ceraunius Catena, as seen by HiRISE.

== See also ==
- Alba Mons
- Fossa (geology)
- HiRISE
- Mars Global Surveyor
- Tharsis
- Volcanism on Mars
