= The Album =

The Album may refer to:

- ABBA: The Album, released in 1977
- The Album (Caravan album), 1980
- The Album (Mantronix album), 1985
- The Album (Cliff Richard album), 1993
- The Album (Haddaway album), 1993
- The Album (Hello Sailor album), 1994
- The Album (Latyrx album), 1997
- The Album (Shane Richie album), 1997
- The Album (The Firm album), 1997
- Terror Squad: The Album, 1999
- The Album (Dj Shah album), 2000
- The Album (Lil Rob album), 2003
- Federation: The Album, 2004
- The Album (Jeckyll & Hyde album), 2007
- The Album (Daniel Schuhmacher album), 2009
- The Album (Achozen album), 2010
- The Album (Aunty Donna album), 2018
- The Album (Teyana Taylor album), 2020
- The Album (Blackpink album), 2020
- The Album (Chase Rice album), 2021
- The Album (Jonas Brothers album), 2023
- The Album, a 1993 album by Masters at Work
- The Album, a 1933 novel by Mary Roberts Rinehart
- The Album, a 2003 album by Okamura & Takkyu
- The Album, a 2003 album by Panjabi MC

== See also ==
- T H E, album by Tricot
- The Albums, a box set of recordings by pop group ABBA released in 2008
- Album (disambiguation)
