= Enipeas (Thessaly) =

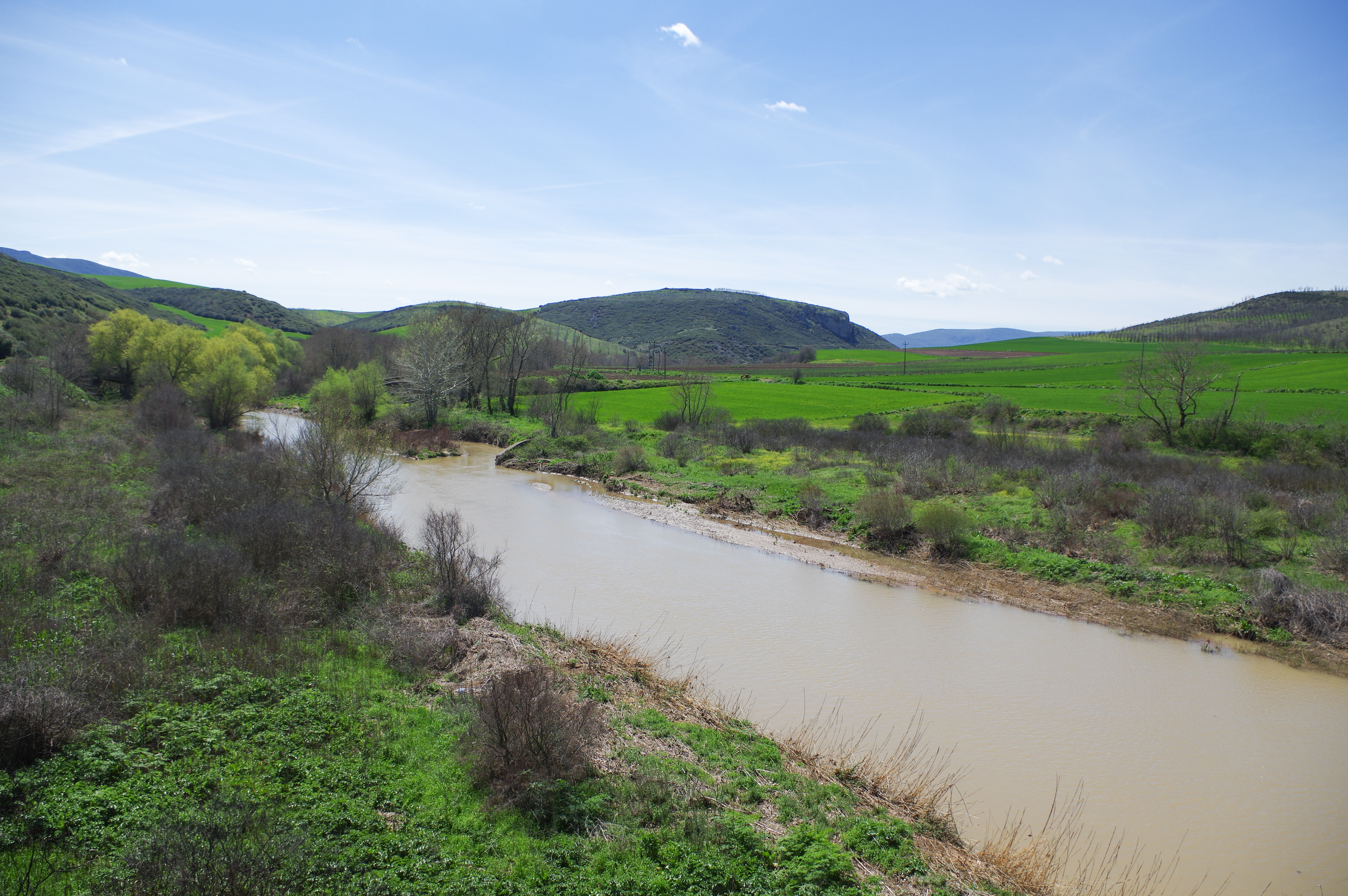
- Enipeas at Xylades, Farsala

Location
- Country: Greece

Physical characteristics
- Source
  - location: Phthiotis, Greece
- Mouth
  - location: Pineios
  - coordinates: 39°34′21″N 22°5′20″E
- Length: 84 km (52 mi)

Basin features
- Progression: Pineios→ Aegean Sea

The Enipeas (Greek: Ενιπέας) or Enipeus (Ancient Greek: Ἐνιπεύς) is a river in central Greece, tributary of the Pineios near Farkadona. It is 84 km (52 mi) long. Its source is in the northern part of Phthiotis, on the plateau of Domokos. Its course runs through several of the tetrades of ancient Thessaly, from Achaea Phthiotis in South through Phthia to finally flow into the Pineios in Histiaeotis.

The banks of the Enipeas constituted the scene of several important battles of history, including those of Cynoscephalae (364 BCE and 197 BCE) and Pharsalus (48 BCE).

== Namesake ==
Enipeus Vallis, a north-south valley on planet Mars is named for this river (and valley), located in the mid-south of the Arcadia quadrangle.
