= Freefall (Jeckyll & Hyde song) =

2007 single by Jeckyll & Hyde

Single by Jeckyll & Hyde

from the album The Album
- B-side: "End of Time"
- Released: 9 March 2007
- Genre: Jumpstyle
- Length: 3:26
- Label: Digdance; Square Beats
- Producer: Jeckyll & Hyde

Jeckyll & Hyde singles chronology
"Frozen Flame" (2006)	"Freefall" (2007)	"Time Flies" (2007)

"Freefall" is a single by Dutch jumpstyle music duo Jeckyll & Hyde, and it was the second and final single of their debut studio album The Album.

It became the first instrumental number-one single in the Netherlands since 1995 where it spent 27 weeks on the Dutch Top 100 Singles chart.

== Track listing ==
=== CD-single ===
1. "Freefall (Radio Mix)" — 3:26
2. "Freefall (Extended Mix)" — 8:47
3. "Frozen Flame (Wezz & Fisher Remix)" — 7:29
4. "Videoclip" — 3:45

=== Download ===
1. "Freefall (Radio Mix)" — 3:26
2. "Freefall (Extended Mix)" — 8:47
3. "Frozen Flame (Wezz & Fisher Remix)" — 7:29

=== 12-inch vinyl ===
1. "Freefall (Extended Mix)" — 8:47
2. "End of Time" — 6:03

=== Maxi-single (Edel) ===
1. "Freefall (Radio Mix)" — 3:26
2. "Freefall (Real Booty Babes Remix)" — 5:43
3. "Freefall (Extended Mix)" — 8:47
4. "Freefall (Real Booty Babes Club Mix)" — 5:45
5. "Frozen Flame (Radio Edit)" — 3:32

=== 12-inch vinyl (Edel) ===
1. "Freefall (Extended Mix)" — 8:47
2. "Freefall (Real Booty Babes Remix)" — 5:43
3. "Frozen Flame (Wezz & Fisher Remix)" — 7:29

== Chart performance ==
Chart performance for "Freefall" in 2007
Chart (2007)	Peak position
Netherlands (Dutch Top 40)	1
Belgium (Ultratop 50)	20
Germany (GfK)	77
Finland (Finland Singles Chart)	7
