= M. alba =

M. alba may refer to:

- Morus alba, the white mulberry, a short-lived, fast-growing, small to medium-sized mulberry tree species native to northern China
- Motacilla alba, the white wagtail, a small passerine bird species found in much of Europe, Asia and parts of north Africa

== See also ==
- Alba (disambiguation)
