= S. albus =

S. albus may refer to:

- Scaphirhynchus albus, the pallid sturgeon, an endangered ray-finned fish species endemic to the waters of the Missouri and lower Mississippi River basins of the United States
- Streptomyces albus, an Actinobacteria species in the genus Streptomyces
- Staphylococcus albus, a Coagulase-negative genus of Gram-positive bacteria

== See also ==
- Albus (disambiguation)
