= Cavus =

Cavus may refer to:

- Albus Cavus, an art collective in New Jersey, USA
- Pes cavus, a human foot type
- Çavuş, an Ottoman title and position
