= Mareotis Fossae =

Mars geographical feature

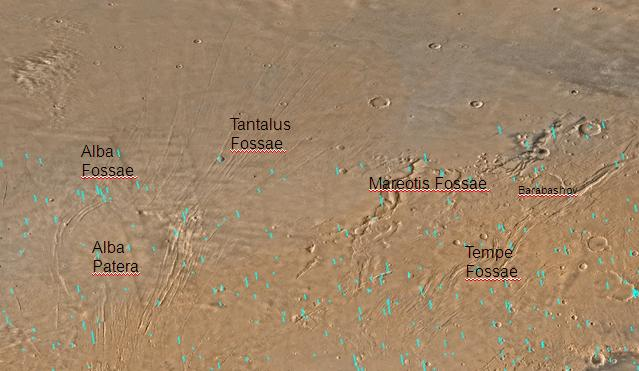
- Map of Arcadia quadrangle with major features labeled. Several large cracks called Fossae are in this area.
- Coordinates: 44°N 76°W

Mareotis Fossae is a group of fossae (troughs) in the Arcadia quadrangle of Mars, located at 44° north latitude and 75.3° west longitude. It is about 1,860 km long and was named after an albedo feature at 32N, 96W.

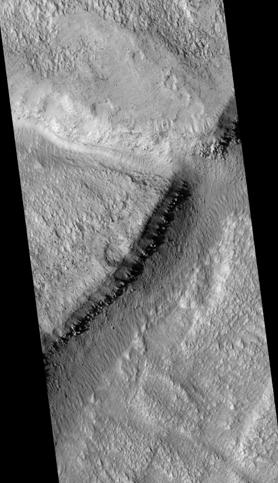
Mareotis Fossae Region, as seen by HiRISE.
