= Album (disambiguation) =

An album may refer to a collection of audio and video recordings or a book for holding a collection of items (such as photographs, stamps, or coins) on pages that are initially blank.

Album may also refer to:

== Music ==
- Album – Generic Flipper, by the band Flipper
- Album (Girls album)
- Album (Joan Jett album)
- Álbum (Lu album)
- Album (Dave Pike Set album)
- Album (Public Image Ltd. album)
- Album (Quorthon album)
- Album (Ghali album)
- Album, by Yuno Miles

== Film and television ==
- Album (2002 film), a 2002 Indian film
- Album (2016 film), a 2016 Turkish film
- "Album" (Land of the Lost), a television episode

== Other uses ==
- Album (Ancient Rome), a board chalked or painted white, on which public notices were inscribed in black
- Album (magazine), a photography magazine
- Comics album, a common format for publishing Franco-Belgian comics
- Confession album, used to record the opinions of friends
- Photo album, a book of related photographs
- Stamp album, a book in which a collection of postage stamps may be stored and displayed
- Sticker album, a book in which a collection of stickers may be stored and displayed

== See also ==
- The Album (disambiguation)
- Alba (disambiguation)
- Albus (disambiguation)
- C. album (disambiguation)
- V. album (disambiguation)
