= Albus =

Albus may refer to:

- Albus (surname)
- Albinus (cognomen), or Albus, an ancient Roman cognomen
- Albus (coin), a coin of the Holy Roman Empire
- Albus (geomancy), a geomantic figure
- 'Albus', a cultivar of rosemary

== Fictional characters ==
- Albus Dumbledore, in J.K. Rowling's Harry Potter series
- Albus Severus Potter, Harry and Ginny's second-born child in the Harry Potter series
- Albus, in the video game Castlevania: Order of Ecclesia

== See also ==
- Alba (disambiguation)
- Album (disambiguation)
- Albus Cavus, an American art collective
- Tundra wolf, (Canis lupus albus)
- Pied crow, (Corvus albus)
