= S. alba =

S. alba is an abbreviation of a species name. In binomial nomenclature the name of a species is always the name of the genus to which the species belongs, followed by the species name (also called the species epithet). In S. alba the genus name has been abbreviated to S. and the species has been spelled out in full. In a document that uses this abbreviation it should always be clear from the context which genus name has been abbreviated.

The Latin species epithet alba means "white". Some of the most common uses of S. alba are:

- Salix alba, the white willow, a tree species native to Europe and western and central Asia
- Sinapis alba, the white mustard, an annual plant species now widespread worldwide although it probably originated in the Mediterranean region
- Spiraea alba, the narrowleaf meadowsweet, pale bridewort or pipestem, a shrub species found in the wet soils of the Allegheny Mountains in Virginia, United States

== See also ==
- Alba (disambiguation)
