= C. album =

C. album may refer to:

- Chenopodium album, the white goosefoot, a plant species extensively cultivated and consumed in Northern India as a food crop
- Cylindrocarpon album, a fungal plant pathogen species

== See also ==
- Album (disambiguation)
