= A. alba =

A. alba may refer to:

An abbreviation of a species name. In binomial nomenclature the name of a species is always the name of the genus to which the species belongs, followed by the species name (also called the species epithet). In A. alba the genus name has been abbreviated to A. and the species has been spelled out in full. In a document that uses this abbreviation it should always be clear from the context which genus name has been abbreviated.

The Latin species epithet alba means "white". Some of the most common uses of A. alba are:

- Abies alba, the European silver fir, a fir species native to the mountains of Europe
- Amphisbaena alba, the white worm lizard, a species of limbless lizard
- Amycolatopsis alba, a high-GC content bacterium species in the genus Amycolatopsis
- Actinomadura alba, a bacterium species in the genus Actinomadura

== See also ==
- Alba (disambiguation)
