= Alba (1952 automobile) =

Portuguese automobile (1952–54)

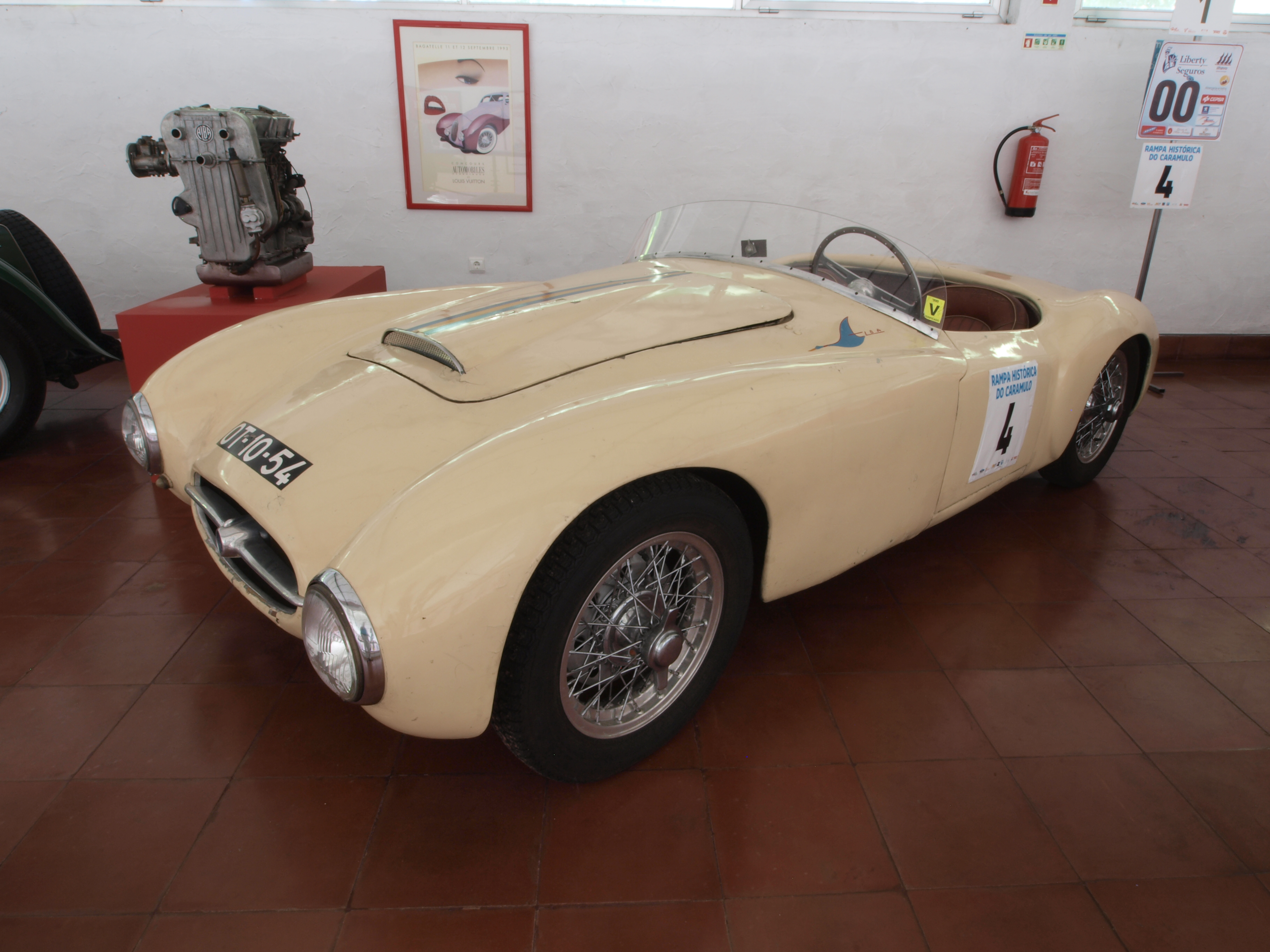
1952 Alba car photographed at the Caramulo museum, 'Museu do Caramulo', Caramulo, Portugal

The Alba was a Portuguese automobile manufactured from 1952 until 1954.

== See also ==
- Alba (1907 automobile)
- Alba (1913 automobile)
