= Alba (1913 automobile) =

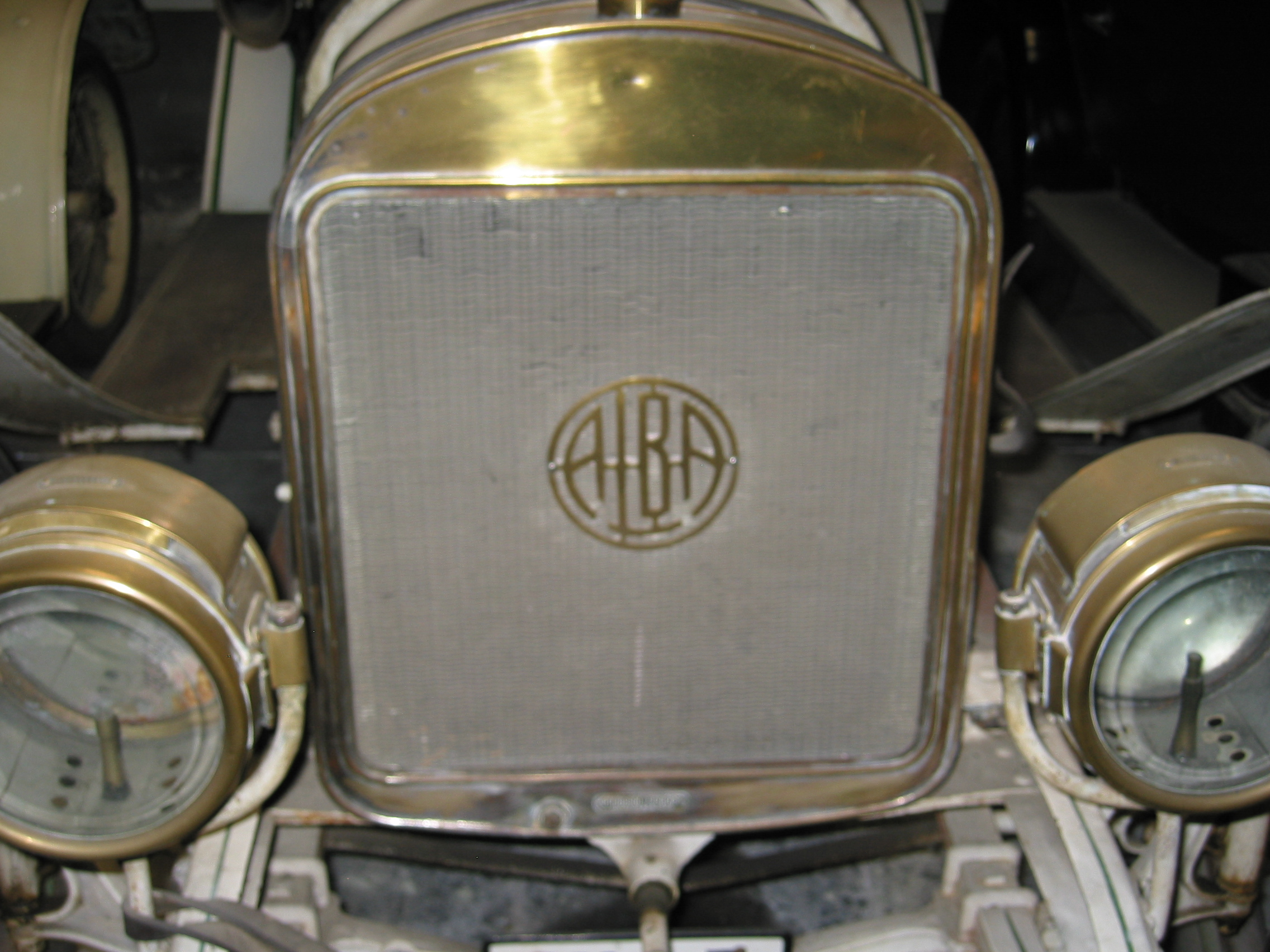
Alba emblem

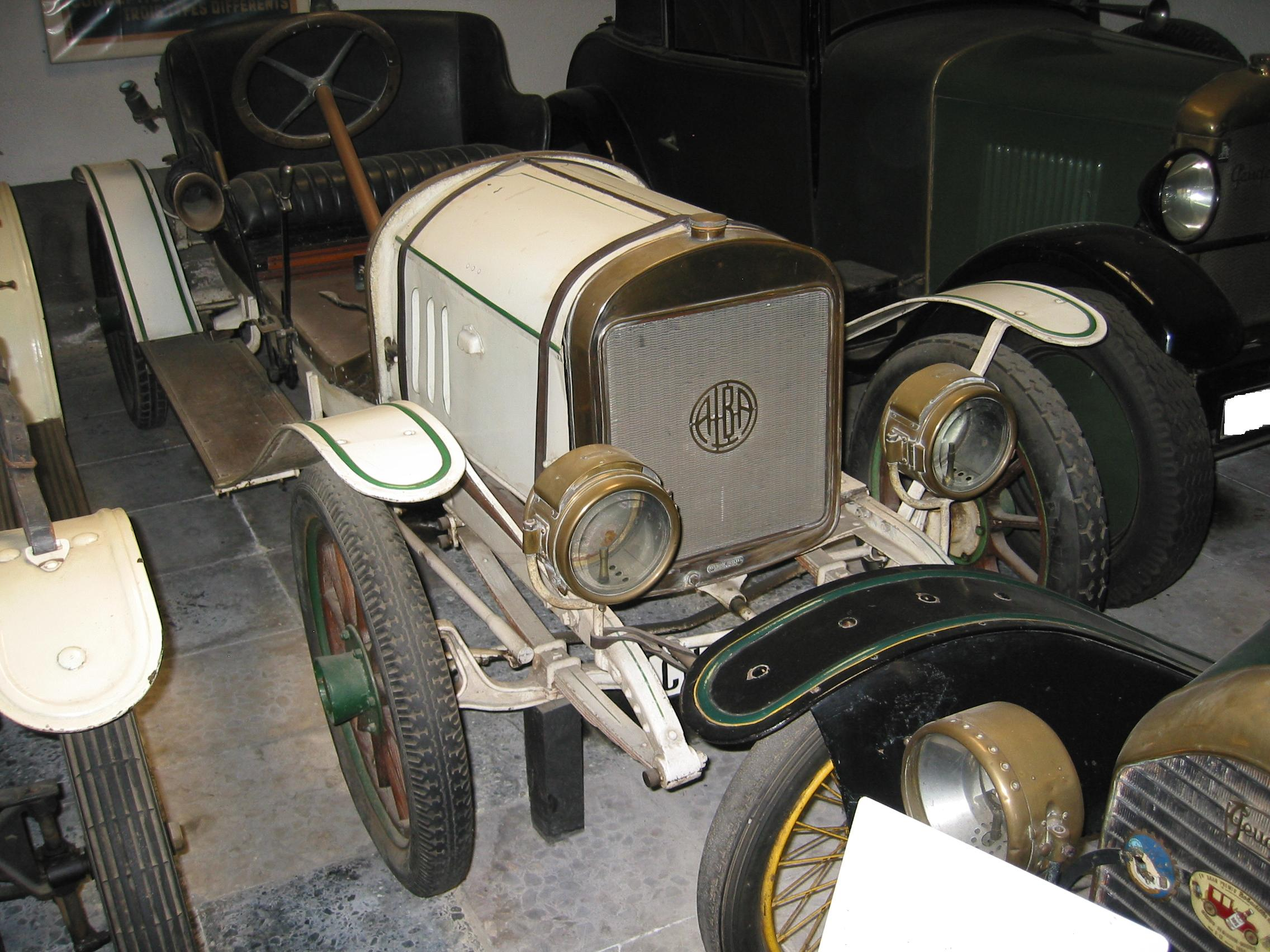
1915 Alba

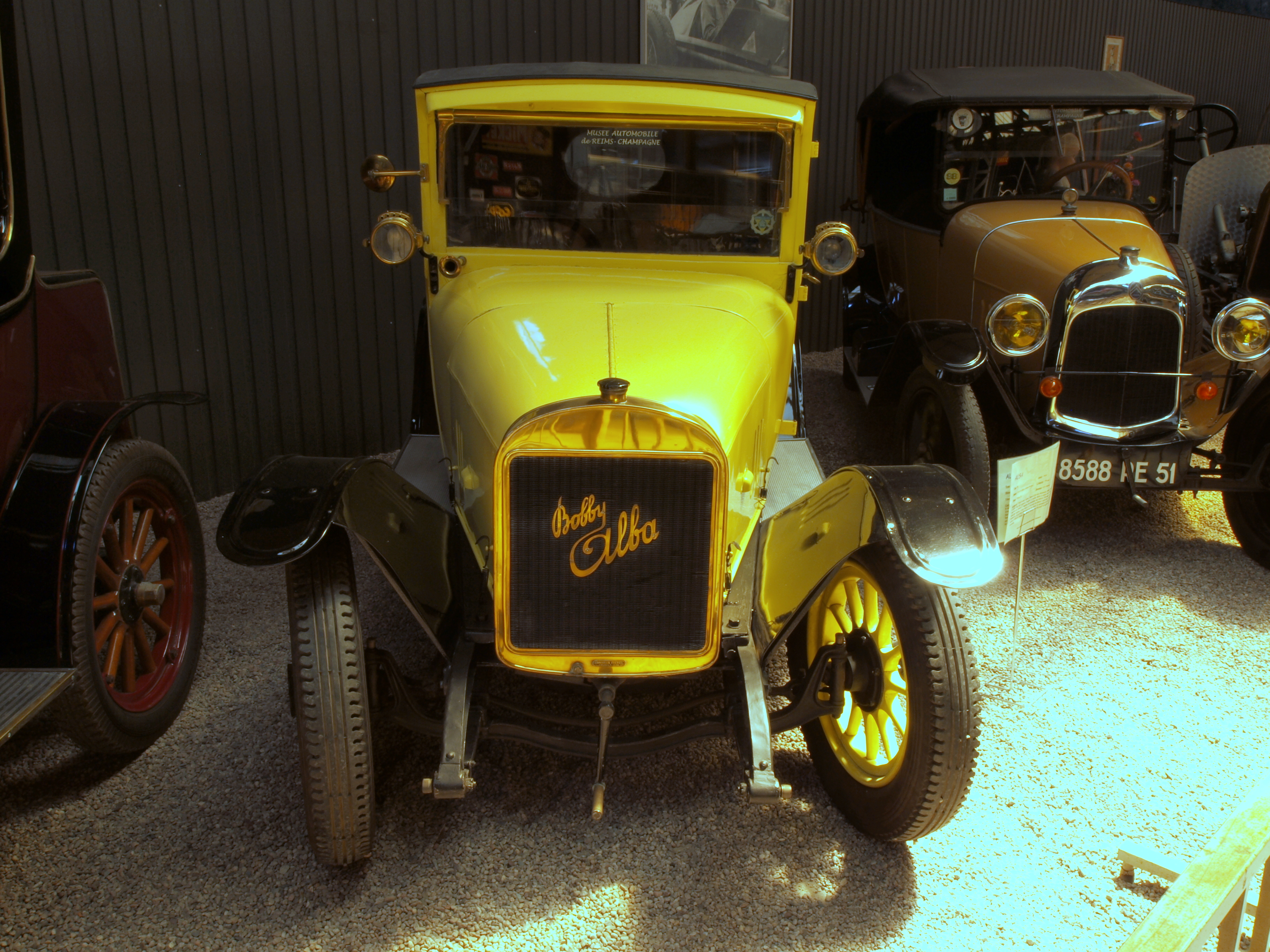
Bobby Alba

The Alba was a French car made by Constructions Métallurgiques, Usines Alba, Suresnes, Seine between 1913 and 1928.

== Technical description ==
The car was offered with a choice of 4-cylinder engines, including a side-valve 8 horsepower (6.0 kW) of 1172 cc made by S.C.A.P., a 1476 cc overhead-valve by S.C.A.P., and a 1994 cc Altos with either side valves or overhead valves.

The Alba was driven through a 4-speed gearbox. The chassis used semi-elliptic springs. Albas were also fitted with front-wheel brakes, an advanced feature on a light car of the time. In 1921 a smaller 1243 cc model, the Bobby Alba, was offered with 3-speed gearbox.

== Racing ==
In 1924, Alba entered the Le Mans 24-hour race, but without success.

== See also ==
- Alba (1907 automobile)
- Alba (1952 automobile)
