= V. album =

V. album may refer to:

- Veratrum album, the false helleborine, a medicinal plant species native to Europe
- Viscum album, the European mistletoe or common mistletoe, a plant species native to Europe and western and southern Asia

== See also ==
- Album (disambiguation)
