= Alba Mons =

Martian volcano

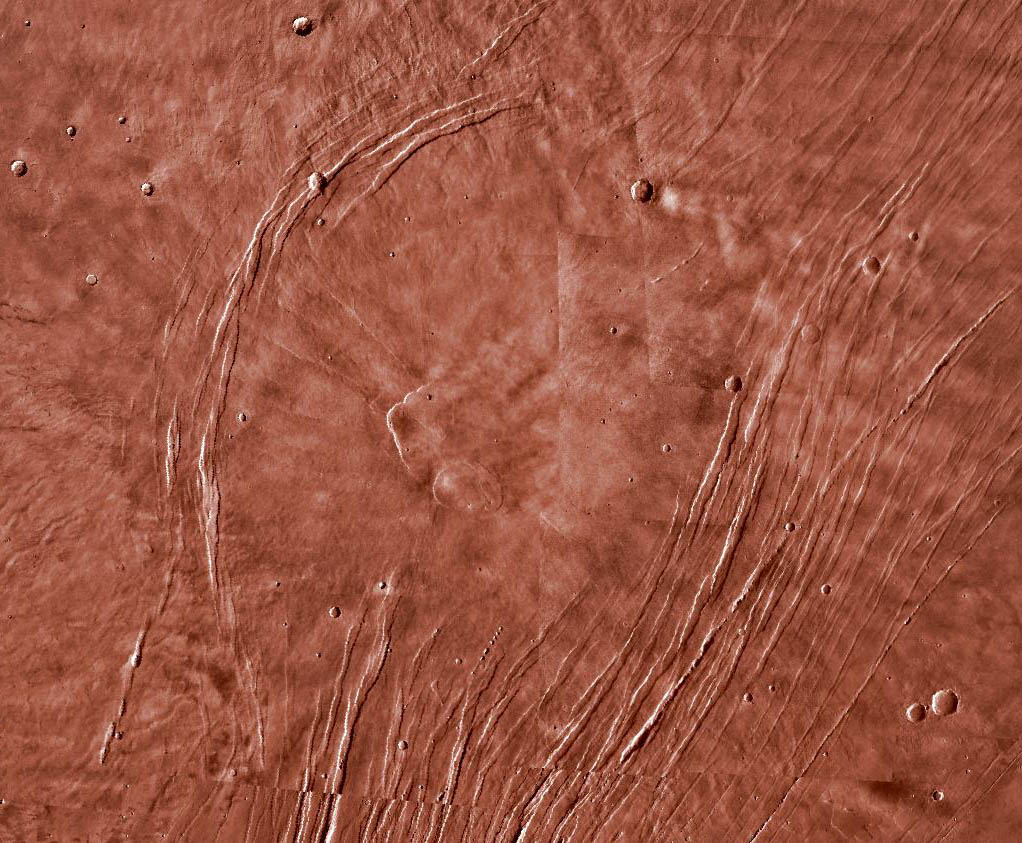
- Viking image of Alba Mons. The volcano's relief is barely visible in orbital photographs. The broad system of fractures on the volcano's eastern side (right) is called Tantalus Fossae. The narrower fracture system on the western flank is Alba Fossae. (Viking color MDIM 2.1)
- Location: Northern Tharsis Rise, Mars
- Coordinates: 40.5°N 250.4°E
- Discoverer: Mariner 9
- Eponym: Latin – White Mountain

Alba Mons (formerly and still occasionally known as Alba Patera, a term that has since been restricted to the volcano's summit caldera; also initially known as the Arcadia ring) is a volcano located in the northern Tharsis region of the planet Mars. It is the biggest volcano on Mars in terms of surface area, with volcanic flow fields that extend for at least 1,350 km (840 mi) from its summit. Although the volcano has a span comparable to that of the United States, it reaches an elevation of only 6.8 km (22,000 ft) at its highest point. This is about one-third the height of Olympus Mons, the tallest volcano on the planet. The flanks of Alba Mons have very gentle slopes. The average slope along the volcano's northern (and steepest) flank is 0.5°, which is over five times lower than the slopes on the other large Tharsis volcanoes. In broad profile, Alba Mons resembles a vast but barely raised welt on the planet's surface. It is a unique volcanic structure with no counterpart on Earth nor elsewhere on Mars.

In addition to its great size and low relief, Alba Mons has a number of other distinguishing features. The central portion of the volcano is surrounded by an incomplete ring of faults (graben) and fractures, called Alba Fossae on the volcano's western flank and Tantalus Fossae on the eastern flank. The volcano also has very long, well preserved lava flows that form a radiating pattern from the volcano's central region. The enormous lengths of some individual flows (>300 km (190 mi)) implies that the lavas were very fluid (low viscosity) and of high volume. Many of the flows have distinctive morphologies, consisting of long, sinuous ridges with discontinuous central lava channels. The low areas between the ridges (particularly along the volcano's northern flank) show a branching pattern of shallow gullies and channels (valley networks) that likely formed by water runoff.

Alba Mons has some of the oldest extensively exposed volcanic deposits in the Tharsis region. Geologic evidence indicates that significant volcanic activity ended much earlier at Alba Mons than at Olympus Mons and the Tharsis Montes volcanoes. Volcanic deposits from Alba Mons range in age from Hesperian to early Amazonian (approximately 3.6 to 3.2 billion years old).

== Name origin ==
For years the volcano's formal name was Alba Patera. Patera (pl. paterae) is Latin for a shallow drinking bowl or saucer. The term was applied to certain ill-defined, scalloped-edged craters that appeared in early spacecraft images to be volcanic (or non-impact) in origin. In September 2007, the International Astronomical Union (IAU) renamed the volcano Alba Mons (Alba Mountain), reserving the term Alba Patera for the volcano's two central depressions (calderas). Nevertheless, the entire volcano is still commonly called Alba Patera in the planetary science literature.

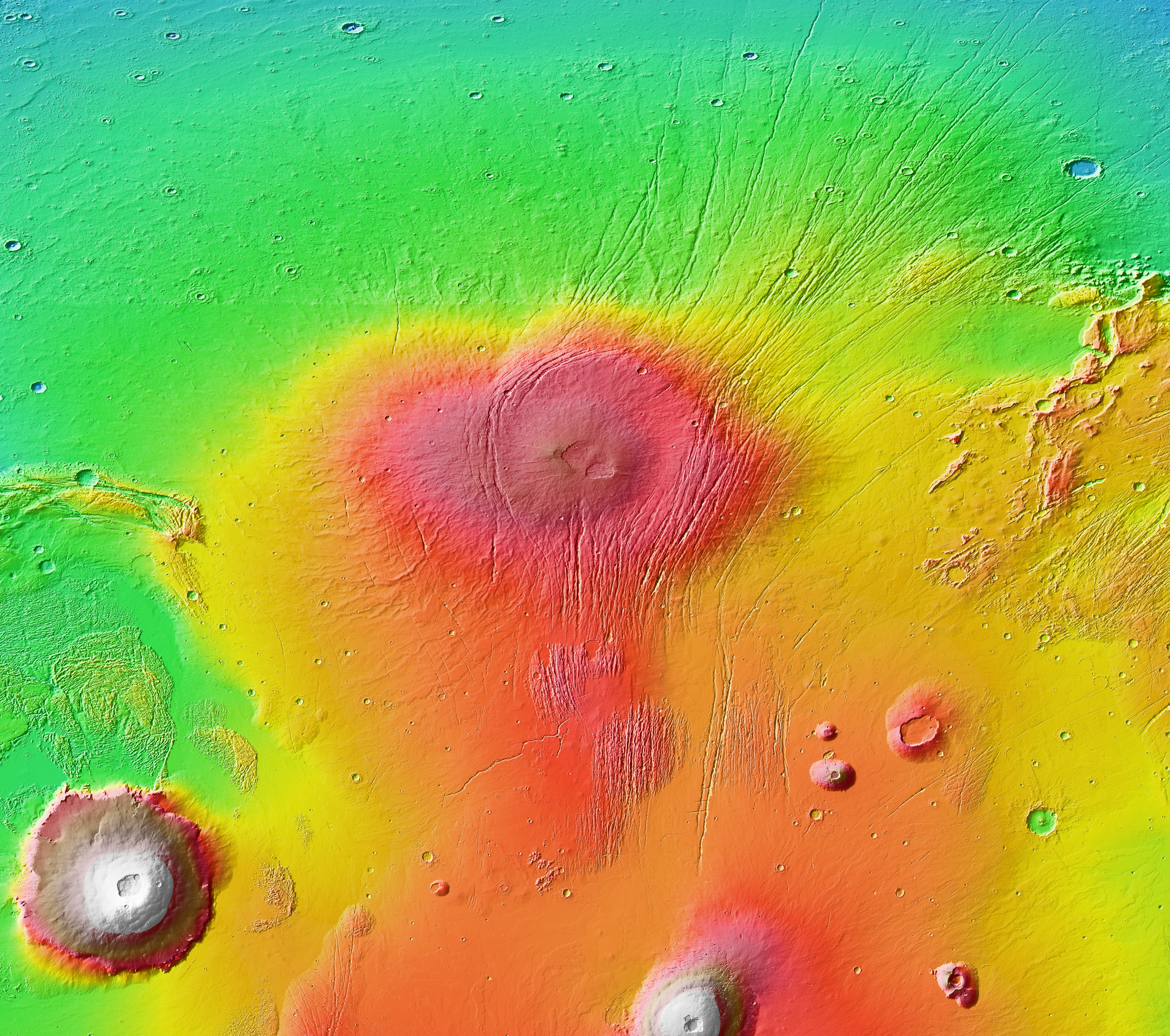
MOLA topographic map of Alba Mons and surroundings. The main edifice appears in colors of red to orange; the surrounding apron is in shades of yellow-orange to green. The relief is greatest to the north because the volcano straddles the dichotomy boundary. Elevated terrain of Ceraunius Fossae, which underlies part of the volcano, extends southward like a handle.

The term Alba is from the Latin word for white and refers to the clouds frequently seen over the region from Earth-based telescopes. The volcano was discovered by the Mariner 9 spacecraft in 1972 and was initially known as the Alba volcanic feature or the Arcadia Ring (in reference to the partial ring of fractures around the volcano). The IAU named the volcano Alba Patera in 1973. The volcano is often simply called Alba when the context is understood.

== Location and size ==
Alba Mons is centered at 40.47°N 250.4°E in the Arcadia quadrangle (MC-3). Much of the volcano's western flank is located in the adjacent Diacria quadrangle (MC-2). Flows from the volcano can be found as far north as 61°N and as far south as 26°N (in the northern Tharsis quadrangle). If one takes the outer margin of the flows as the volcano's base, then Alba Mons has north–south dimensions of about 2,000 km (1,200 mi) and a maximum width of 3,000 km (1,900 mi). It covers an area of at least 5.7 million km^{2} and has a volume of about 2.5 million km^{3}. The volcano dominates the northern portion of the Tharsis bulge and is so large and geologically distinct that it can almost be treated as an entire volcanic province unto itself.

Although Alba Mons reaches a maximum elevation of 6.8 km (22,000 ft) above Mars’ datum, the elevation difference between its summit and surrounding terrain (relief) is much greater on the north side of the volcano (about 7.1 km (23,000 ft)) compared to the south side (about 2.6 km (8,500 ft)). The reason for this asymmetry is that Alba straddles the dichotomy boundary between the cratered uplands in the south and the lowlands to the north. The plains underlying the volcano slope northward toward the Vastitas Borealis, which has an average surface elevation of 4.5 km (15,000 ft) below datum (-4.500 km (14,760 ft)). The southern part of Alba Mons is built on a broad, north–south topographic ridge that corresponds to the fractured, Noachian-aged terrain of Ceraunius Fossae (pictured left).

== Physical description ==
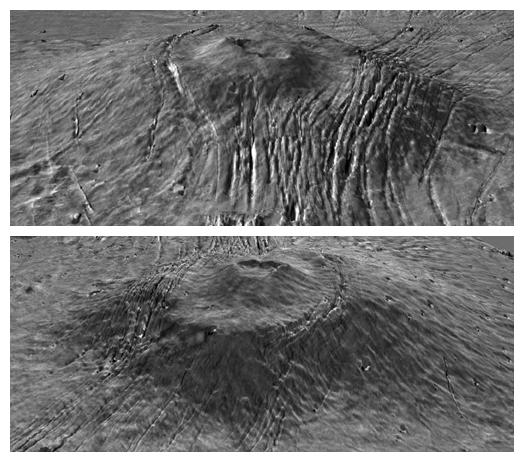
MOLA exaggerated relief view of Alba Mons central edifice and summit dome viewed from south (top) and north (bottom). Vertical exaggeration is 10x.

Alba's size and low profile makes it a difficult structure to study visually, as much of the volcano's relief is indiscernible in orbital photographs. However, between 1997 and 2001, the Mars Orbital Laser Altimeter (MOLA) instrument of the Mars Global Surveyor spacecraft took over 670 million precise elevation measurements across the planet. Using MOLA data, planetary scientists are able to study subtle details of the volcano's shape and topography that were invisible in images from earlier spacecraft such as Viking.

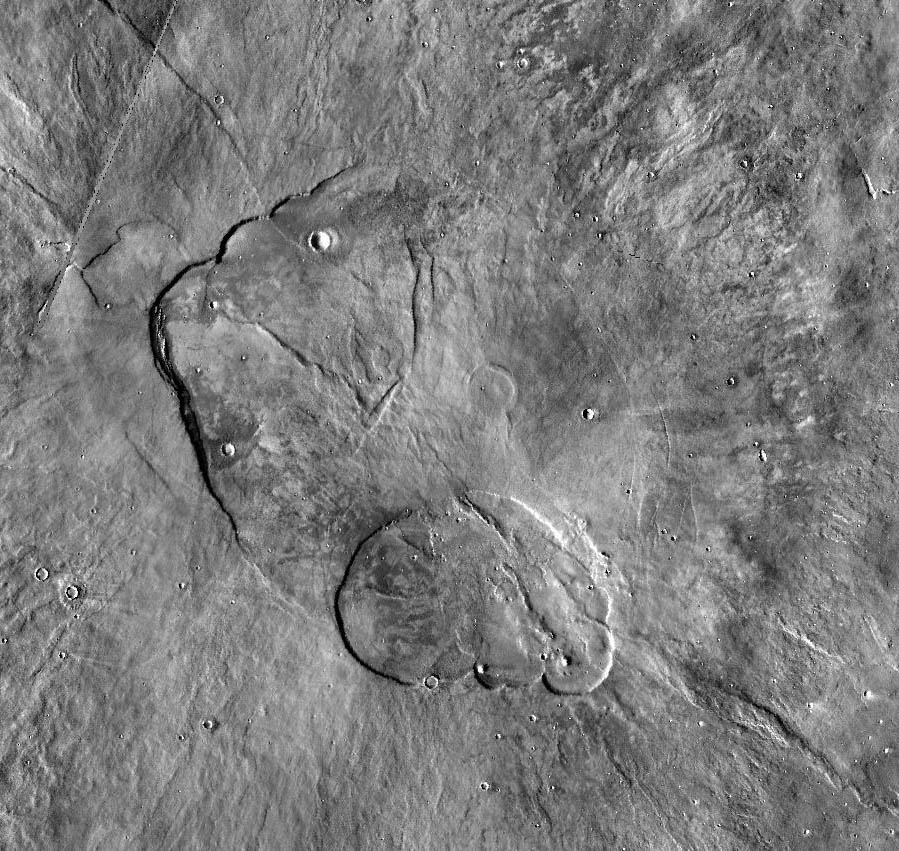
Central caldera complex of Alba Mons. The calderas are shallow compared to those on other Tharsis volcanoes. Within the larger caldera is a small shield capped by a concentric circular feature (near center). Image is about 200 km (120 mi) across (THEMIS daytime IR mosaic).

The volcano consists of two, roughly concentric components: 1) an oval-shaped central body with approximate dimensions of 1,500 km (930 mi) by 1,000 km (620 mi) across surrounded by 2) a vast, nearly level apron of lava flows that extends an additional 1,000 km (620 mi) or so outward. The central body is the main topographic edifice of the volcano, marked by pronounced break in slope at the inner boundary of the apron. Extending east and west from the central edifice are two broad fan-shaped lobes (or shoulders), which give the volcano its elongation in the east–west direction. The central edifice has the steepest slopes on the volcano, although they are still only 1°. The crest and upper flanks of the edifice are cut by a partial ring of graben that are part of the Alba and Tantalus Fossae fracture system. Inside the ring of graben is an annulus of very low and in places reversed slopes that forms a plateau on top of which lies a central dome 350 km (220 mi) across capped by a nested caldera complex. Thus, the central edifice of Alba Mons resembles a partially collapsed shield volcano with a smaller, summit dome sitting on top (pictured right). The summit dome has a distinct tilt to the east.

The caldera complex consists of a large caldera about 170 km (110 mi) by 100 km (62 mi) across at the center of the summit dome. A smaller, kidney-shaped caldera (about 65 km (40 mi) by 45 km (28 mi)) lies in the southern half of the larger one. Both calderas are relatively shallow, reaching a maximum depth of only 1.2 km (3,900 ft).

The larger caldera is bounded at the westernmost end by a steep, semicircular wall 500 m (1,600 ft) tall. This wall disappears at the northern and southern sides of the caldera, where it is buried by volcanic flows originating from the younger, smaller caldera. The smaller caldera is outlined everywhere by a steep wall that varies in height over a range of a few hundred meters. The walls of both calderas are scalloped, suggesting multiple episodes of subsidence and/or mass wasting. Two small shields or domes, several hundred meters high, occur within and adjacent to the large caldera. The shield within the large caldera is about 50 km (31 mi) across. It is capped by a peculiar concentric circular feature 10 km (6.2 mi) in diameter (pictured left).

Calderas form by collapse following withdrawal and depletion of a magma chamber after an eruption. Caldera dimensions allow scientists to infer the geometry and depth of the magma chamber beneath the summit of the volcano. The shallowness of Alba's calderas compared to those seen on Olympus Mons and most of the other Tharsis volcanoes implies that Alba's magma reservoir was wider and shallower than those of its neighbors.

== Surface characteristics ==
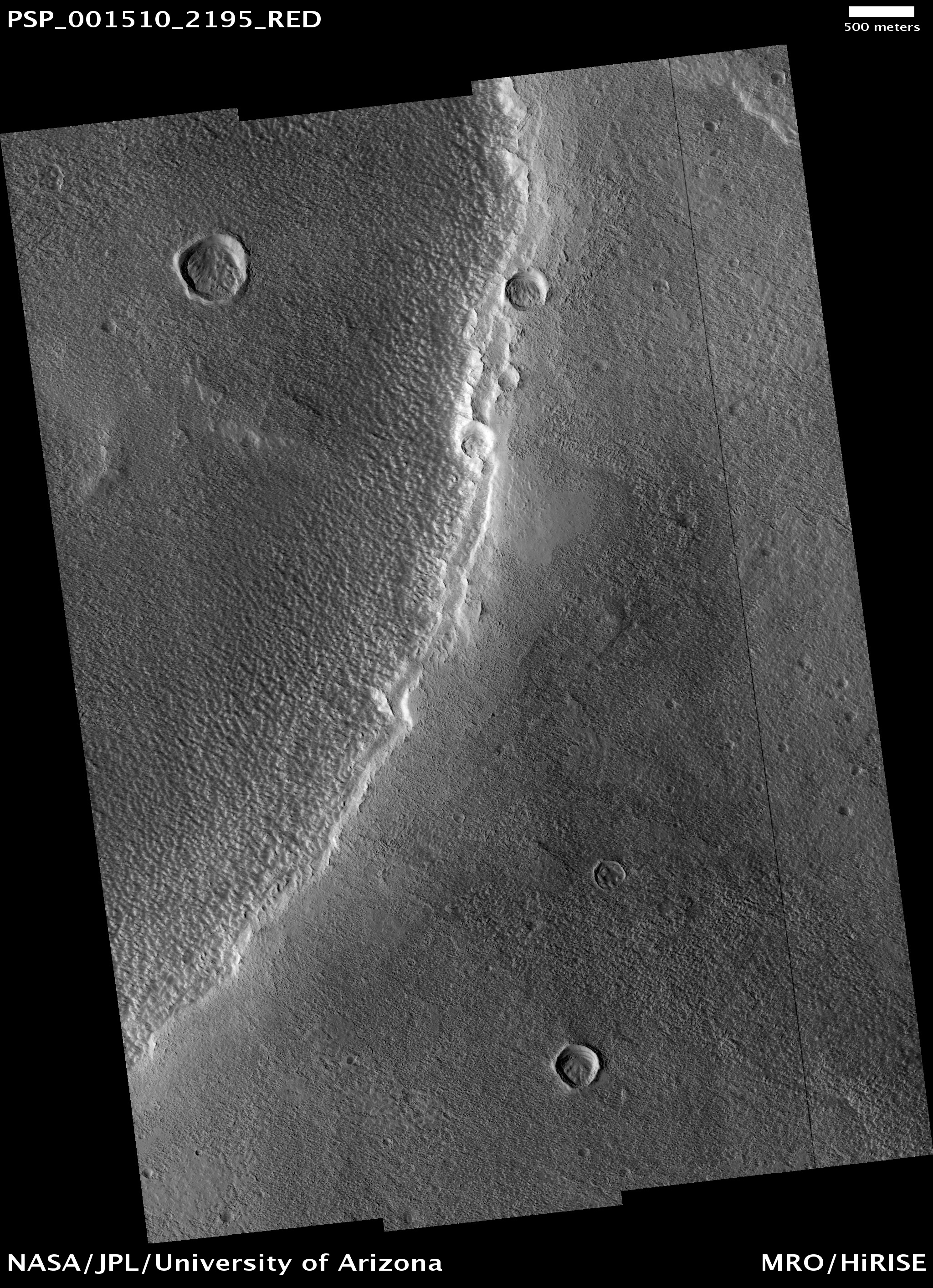
Dust mantle at the SW edge of small caldera on Alba Mons (HiRISE).

Most of the central edifice of Alba Mons is mantled with a layer of dust approximately 2 m (6.6 ft) thick. The dust layer is visible in high resolution images of the summit (pictured right). In places, the dust has been carved into streamlined shapes by the wind and is cut by small landslides. However, some isolated patches of dust appear smooth and undisturbed by the wind.

Heavy dust cover is also indicated by the high albedo (reflectivity) and low thermal inertia of the region. Martian dust is visually bright (albedo > 0.27) and has a low thermal inertia because of its small grain size (<40 μm (0.0016 in)). (See the Martian surface.) However, the thermal inertia is high and albedo lower on the northern flanks of the volcano and in the apron area farther to the north. This suggests that the northern portions of Alba's surface may contain a higher abundance of duricrusts, sand, and rocks compared to the rest of the volcano.

High thermal inertia can also indicate the presence of exposed water ice. Theoretical models of water-equivalent hydrogen (WEH) from epithermal neutrons detected by the Mars Odyssey Neutron Spectrometer (MONS) instrument suggest that the regolith just below the surface on Alba's northern flank may contain 7.6% WEH by mass. This concentration could indicate water present as remnant ice or in hydrated minerals. Alba Mons is one of several areas on the planet that may contain thick deposits of near-surface ice preserved from an earlier epoch (1 to 10 million years ago), when Mars’ axial tilt (obliquity) was higher and mountain glaciers existed at mid-latitudes and tropics. Water ice is unstable at these locations under present conditions and will tend to sublimate into the atmosphere. Theoretical calculations indicate that remnant ice can be preserved below depths of 1 m if it is blanketed by a high-albedo and low-thermal-inertia material, such as dust.

The mineral composition of rocks making up Alba Mons is difficult to determine from orbital reflectance spectrometry because of the predominance of surface dust throughout the region. However, global-scale surface composition can be inferred from the Mars Odyssey gamma-ray spectrometer (GRS). This instrument has allowed scientists to determine the distribution of hydrogen (H), silicon (Si), iron (Fe), chlorine (Cl), thorium (Th) and potassium (K) in the shallow subsurface. Multivariate analysis of GRS data indicates that Alba Mons and the rest of the Tharsis region belongs to a chemically distinct province characterized by relatively low Si (19 wt%), Th (0.58 ppm), and K (0.29 wt%) content, but with Cl abundance (0.56 wt%) higher than Mars' surface average. Low silicon content is indicative of mafic and ultramafic igneous rocks, such as basalt and dunite.

Alba Mons is an unlikely target for unmanned landers in the near future. The thick mantle of dust obscures the underlying bedrock, probably making in situ rock samples hard to come by and thus reducing the site's scientific value. The dust layer would also likely cause severe maneuvering problems for rovers. Ironically, the summit region was originally considered a prime backup landing site for the Viking 2 lander because the area appeared so smooth in Mariner 9 images taken in the early 1970s.

== Geology ==
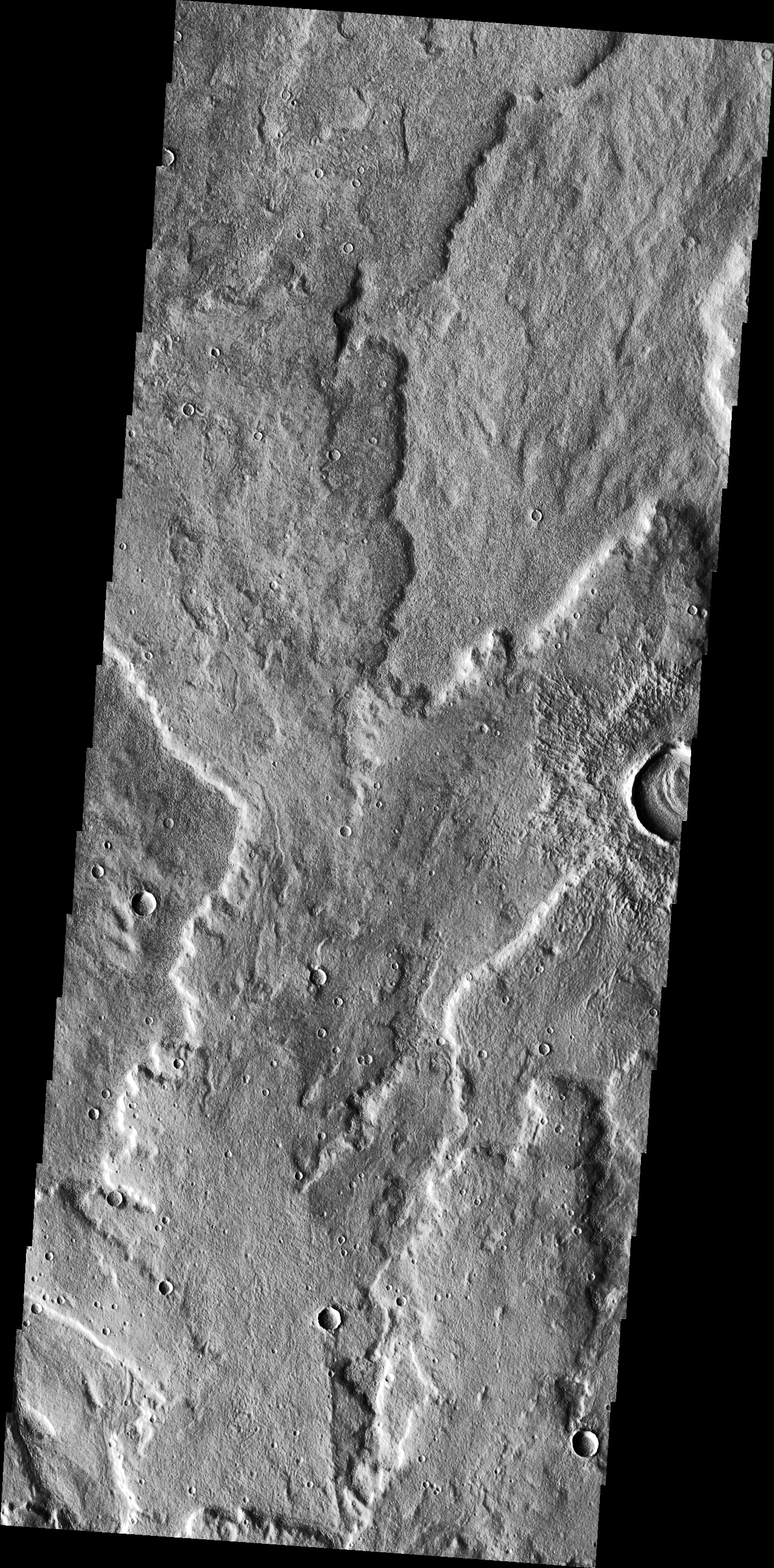
Sheet flows on northwestern flank of Alba Mons. Note multiple overlapping lobes (THEMIS VIS)

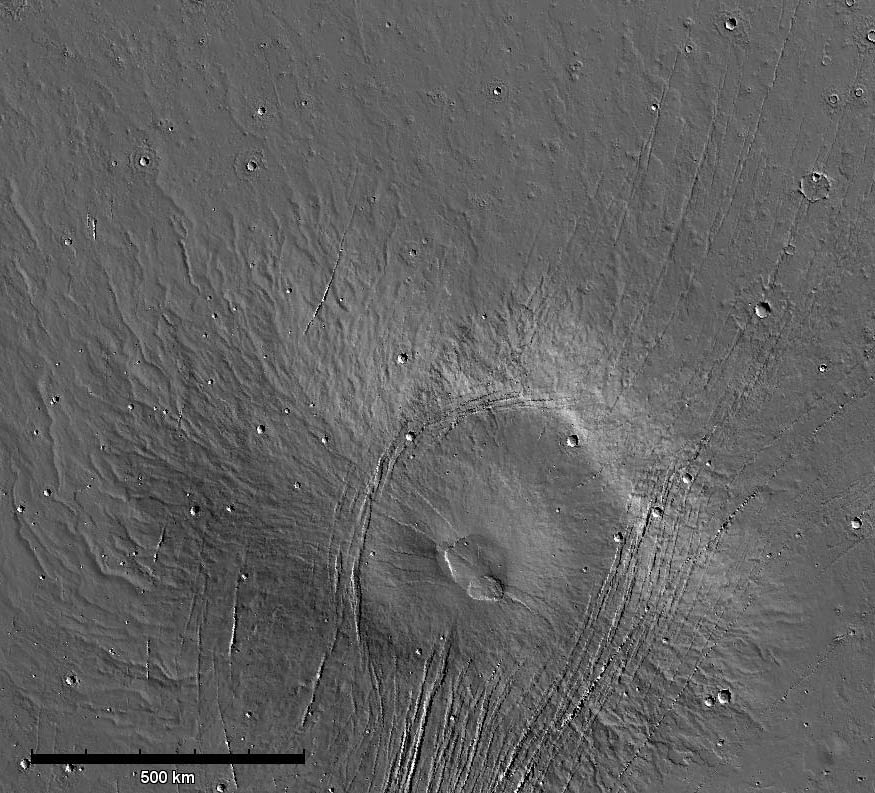
Lava flows extending north and northwest of Alba Mons. The sinuous ridges are tube- and channel-fed flows. Faint, degraded flows and ridges in the north are part of Alba's broad lava apron (MOLA).

Much of the geologic work on Alba Mons has focused on the morphology of its lava flows and the geometry of the faults cutting its flanks. Surface features of the volcano, such as gullies and valley networks, have also been extensively studied. These efforts have the overall goal of deciphering the geologic history of the volcano and the volcano-tectonic processes involved in its formation. Such understanding can shed light on the nature and evolution of the Martian interior and the planet's climate history.

=== Lava flows ===
Alba Mons is notable for the remarkable length, diversity, and crisp appearance of its lava flows. Many of the flows radiate from the summit, but others appear to originate from vents and fissures on the lower flanks of the volcano. Individual flows may exceed 500 km (310 mi) in length. Lava flows near the summit calderas appear to be significantly shorter and narrower than those on more distal parts of the volcano. The two most common types of volcanic flows on Alba Mons are sheet flows and tube-and-channel fed flows.

Sheet flows (also called tabular flows) form multiple, overlapping lobes with steep margins. The flows typically lack central channels. They are flat-topped and generally about 5 km (3.1 mi) wide on the upper flanks of the volcano but become much wider and lobate toward their downstream (distal) ends. Most appear to originate near the Alba and Tantalus Fossae fracture ring, but the actual vents for the sheet flows are not visible and may have been buried by their own products. Flow thicknesses have been measured for a number of sheet flows based on MOLA data. The flows range from 20 m (66 ft) to 130 m (430 ft) thick and are generally thickest at their distal margins.

The second major type of lava flows on the flanks of Alba Mons are called tube- and channel-fed flows, or crested flows. They form long, sinuous ridges that radiate outward from the central region of the volcano. They are typically 5 km (3.1 mi)-10 km (6.2 mi) wide. An individual ridge may have a discontinuous channel or line of pits that run along its crest. Tube- and channel-fed flows are particularly prominent on the western flank of the volcano where individual ridges can be traced for several hundred kilometers. The origin of the ridges is uncertain. They may form by successive buildup of solidified lava at the mouth of a channel or tube, with each pulse of flowing lava adding to the length of the ridge.

In addition to the two main types of flows, numerous undifferentiated flows are present around Alba Mons that are either too degraded to characterize or have hybrid characteristics. Flat-topped ridges with indistinct margins and rugged surfaces, interpreted as lava flows, are common along Alba's lower flanks and become less sharp in appearance with increasing distance from the edifice. In high resolution images, many of the flows on the volcano's upper flanks originally characterized as sheet flows have central channels with levee-like ridges.

The morphology of lava flows can indicate properties of the lava when molten, such as its rheology and flow volume. Together, these properties can provide clues to the lava's composition and eruption rates. For example, lava tubes on Earth only form in lavas of basaltic composition. Silica-rich lavas such as andesite are too viscous for tubes to form. Early quantitative analysis of Alba's lava flows indicated that the lavas had low yield strength and viscosity and were erupted at very high rates. Alba's unusually low profile suggested to some that extremely fluid lavas were involved in the volcano's construction, perhaps komatiites, which are primitive ultramafic lavas that form at very high temperatures. However, more recent work on the tube- and channel-fed flows indicates lava viscosities within the range of typical basalts (between 100 and 1 million Pa s^{−1}). Calculated flow rates are also lower than originally thought, ranging from 10 to 1.3 million m^{3} per second. The lower range of eruption rates for Alba Mons is within the range of the highest terrestrial volcanic flows, such as the 1984 Mauna Loa, North Queensland (McBride Province), and the Columbia River basalts. The highest range is several orders of magnitude higher than the effusive rates for any terrestrial volcano.

Since the late 1980s, some researchers have suspected that Alba Mons eruptions included a significant amount of pyroclastics (and therefore explosive activity) during early phases of its development. The evidence was based on the presence of numerous valley networks on the volcano's northern flanks that appeared to be carved by running water (see below). This evidence combined with thermal inertia data, which indicated a surface dominated by fine-grained materials, suggested an easily erodible material, such as volcanic ash, was present. The volcano's extremely low profile is also more easily explained if the edifice were built largely from pyroclastic flow deposits (ignimbrites).

More recent data from Mars Global Surveyor and the Mars Odyssey spacecraft have shown no specific evidence that explosive eruptions ever occurred at Alba Mons. An alternative explanation for the valley networks on the north side of the volcano is that they were produced through sapping or melting of ice-rich dust deposited during a relatively recent, Amazonian-aged glacial epoch.

In summary, current geologic analysis of Alba Mons suggests that the volcano was built by lavas with rheological properties similar to basalts. If early explosive activity happened at Alba Mons, the evidence (in the form of extensive ash deposits) is largely buried by younger basaltic lavas.

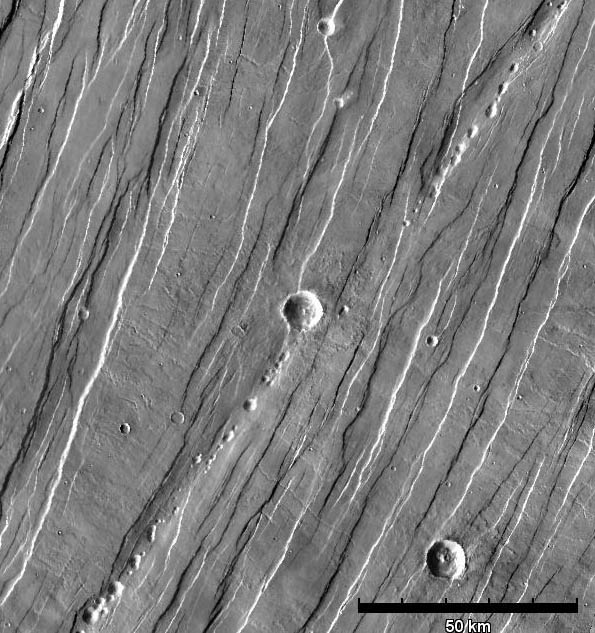
Simple graben and horsts in Tantalus Fossae on eastern flank of Alba Mons. Line of pit craters suggests drainage into subsurface voids, possibly created by tension cracks (THEMIS IR daytime mosaic).

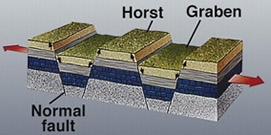
Graben are formed by extensional stresses (red arrows) in the crust. Graben consist of flat-floored valleys bound by opposite-facing normal faults, and are often separated by upland blocks called horsts.

=== Tectonic features ===
The immense system of fractures surrounding Alba Mons is perhaps the most striking feature of the volcano. The fractures are tectonic features indicating stresses in the planet's lithosphere. They form when the stresses exceed the yield strength of rock, resulting in the deformation of surface materials. Typically, this deformation is manifested as slip on faults that are recognizable in images from orbit.

Alba's tectonic features are almost entirely extensional, consisting of normal faults, graben and tension cracks. The most common extensional features on Alba Mons (and Mars in general) are simple graben. Graben are long, narrow troughs bound by two inward-facing normal faults that enclose a downfaulted block of crust (pictured right). Alba has perhaps the clearest display of simple graben on the entire planet. Alba's graben are up to 1,000 km (620 mi) long, and have a width on the order of 2 km (1.2 mi)–10 km (6.2 mi), with depths of 100 m (330 ft)–350 m (1,150 ft).

Tension cracks (or joints) are extensional features produced when the crust is wrenched apart with no significant slippage between the separated rock masses. In theory they should appear as deep fissures with sharp V-shaped profiles, but in practice they are often difficult to distinguish from graben because their interiors rapidly fill with talus from the surrounding walls to produce relatively flat, graben-like floors. Pit crater chains (catenae), common within many graben on Alba's flanks, may be the surface manifestation of deep tension cracks into which surface material has drained.

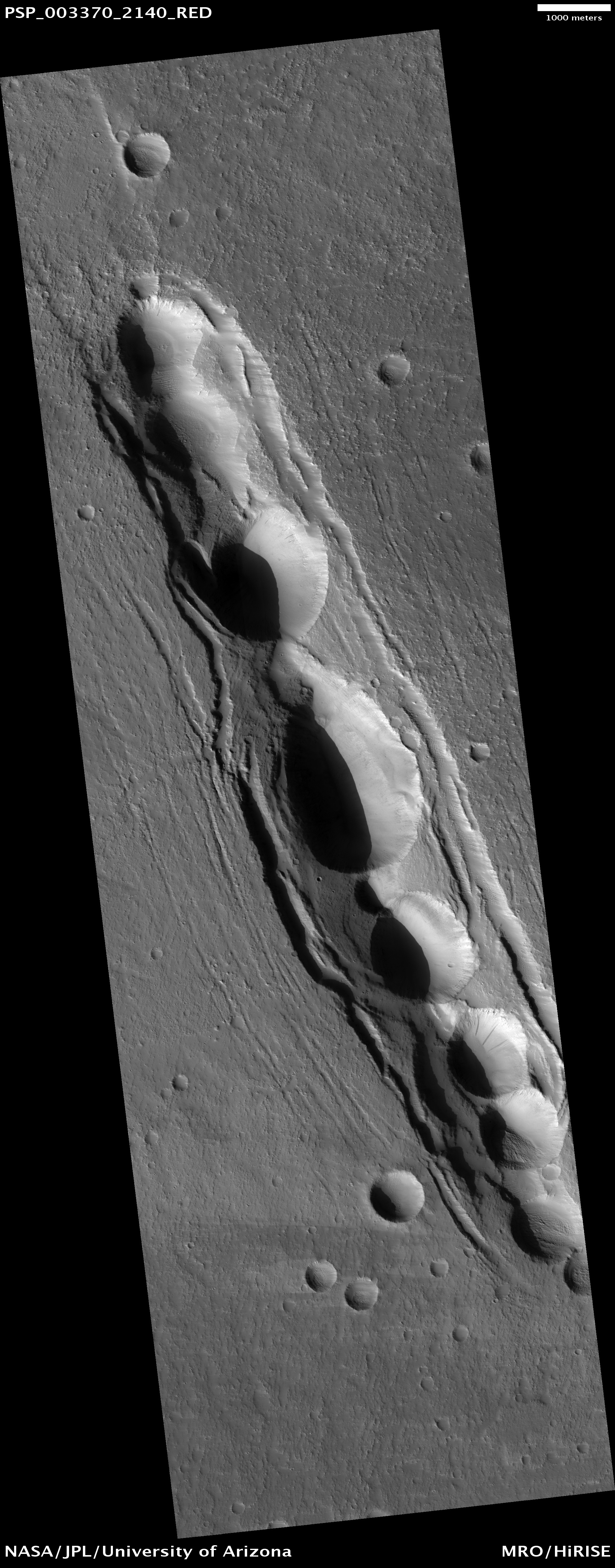
Pit craters in Cyane Fossae, as seen by HiRISE.

The graben and fractures around Alba Mons (hereafter simply called faults unless otherwise indicated) occur in swarms that go by different names depending on their location with respect to Alba's center. South of the volcano is a broad region of intensely fractured terrain called Ceraunius Fossae, which consists of roughly parallel arrays of narrow, north–south oriented faults. These faults diverge around the flanks of the volcano, forming an incomplete ring about 500 km (310 mi) in diameter. The set of faults on Alba's western flank is called Alba Fossae and the one on the eastern flank Tantalus Fossae. North of the volcano, the faults splay outward in a northeasterly directions for distances of many hundreds of kilometers. The pattern of faults curving around Alba's flanks has been likened in appearance to the grain of a piece of wood running past a knot. The entire Ceraunius-Alba-Tantalus fault system is at least 3,000 km (1,900 mi) long and 900 km (560 mi)–1,000 km (620 mi) wide

Several causes for the faults have been suggested, including regional stresses created by the Tharsis bulge, volcanic dikes, and crustal loading by Alba Mons itself. The faults of Ceraunius and Tantalus Fossae are roughly radial to the center of Tharsis and are likely a crustal response to the sagging weight of the Tharsis bulge. The faults ringing Alba's summit region may be due to a combination of loading from the Alba edifice and magma uplift or underplating from the underlying mantle. Some of the fractures are likely the surface expression of gigantic dike swarms radial to Tharsis. An image from High Resolution Imaging Science Experiment (HiRISE) on the Mars Reconnaissance Orbiter (MRO) shows a line of rimless pit craters in Cyane Fossae on the Alba's western flank (pictured right). The pits likely formed by the collapse of surface materials into open fractures created as magma intruded the subsurface rock to form dikes.

=== Valleys and gullies ===
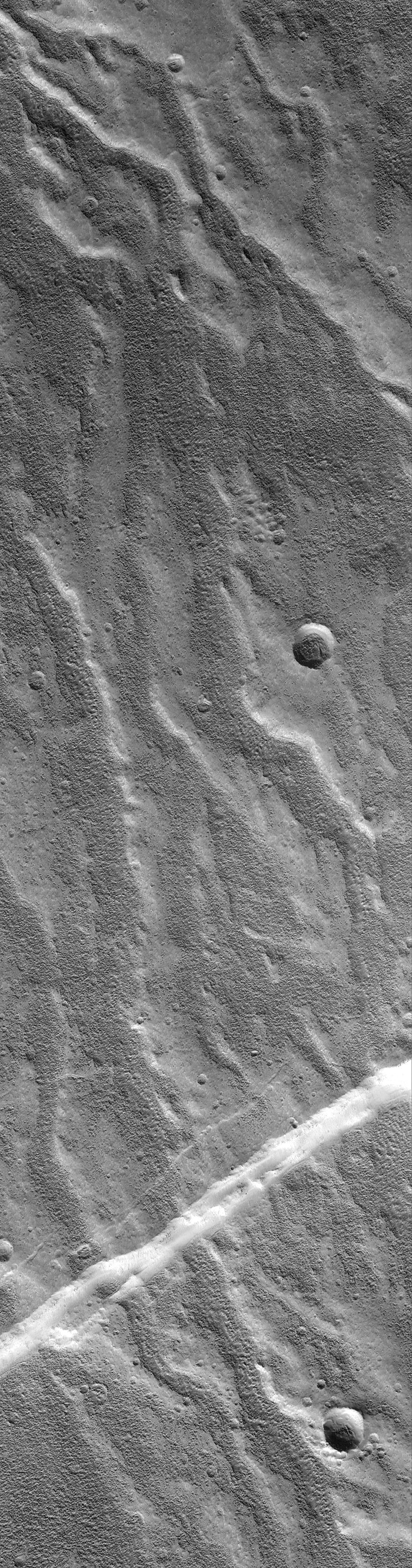
High resolution view of valley network on NW flank of Alba Mons. Younger fault crosscuts the valleys. Image is about 3 km (1.9 mi) across. (Mars Global Surveyor, MOC-NA)

The northern slopes of Alba Mons contain numerous branching channel systems or valley networks that superficially resemble drainage features produced on Earth by rainfall. Alba's valley networks were identified in Mariner 9 and Viking images in the 1970s, and their origin has long been a topic of Mars research. Valley networks are most common in the ancient Noachian-aged southern highlands of Mars, but also occur on the flanks of some of the large volcanoes. The valley networks on Alba Mons are Amazonian in age and thus significantly younger than the majority of those in the southern highlands. This fact presents a problem for researchers who propose that valley networks were carved by rainfall runoff during an early, warm and wet period of Martian history. If the climate conditions changed billions of years ago into today's cold and dry Mars (where rainfall is impossible), how does one explain the younger valleys on Alba Mons? Did Alba's valley networks form differently from those in the highlands, and if so, how? Why do the valleys on Alba Mons occur mainly on the northern flanks of the volcano? These questions are still being debated.

In Viking images, the resemblance of Alba's valley networks to terrestrial pluvial (rainfall) valleys is quite striking. The valley networks show a fine-textured, parallel to dendritic pattern with well-integrated tributary valleys and drainage densities comparable to those on Earth's Hawaiian volcanoes. However, stereoscopic images from the High Resolution Stereo Camera (HRSC) on the European Mars Express orbiter show that the valleys are relatively shallow (30 m (98 ft) or less) and more closely resemble rills or gullies from intermittent runoff erosion than valleys formed from sustained erosion. It seems likely that the valleys on Alba Mons formed as a result of transient erosional processes, possibly related to snow or ice deposits melting during volcanic activity, or to short-lived periods of global climate change. (See Surface characteristics, above.) Whether the eroded material is an ice-rich dust or friable volcanic ash is still uncertain.

=== Geologic history ===
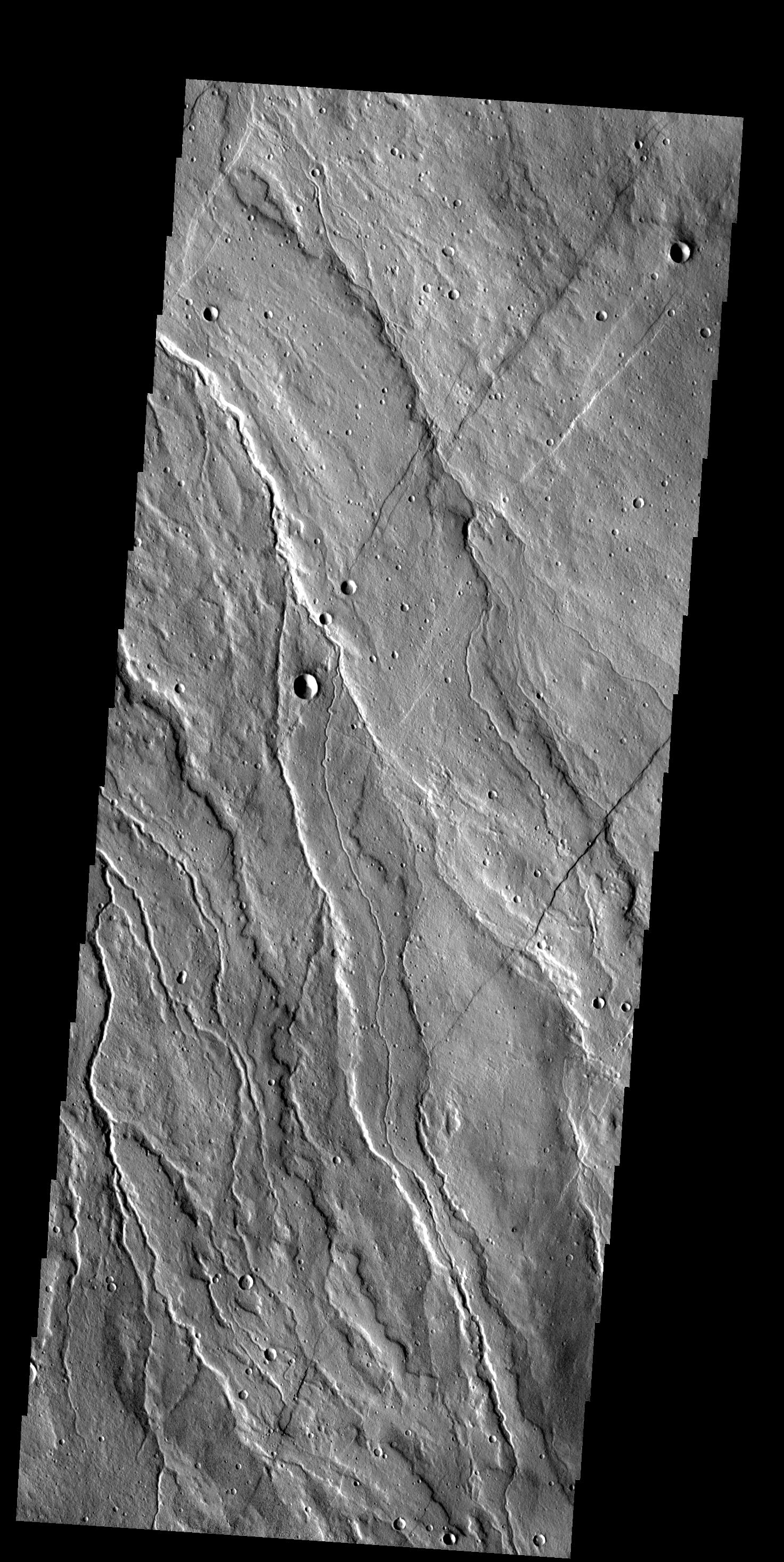
Lava flows with central channels on NW flank of Alba Mons. Note that the lava flows are crosscut by faults and graben, indicating that the faults are younger than the flows (THEMIS VIS).

Alba's well-preserved lava flows and faults provide an excellent photogeologic record of the volcano's evolution. Using crater counting and basic principles of stratigraphy, such as superposition and cross-cutting relationships, geologists have been able to reconstruct much of Alba's geologic and tectonic history. Most of the constructional volcanic activity at Alba is believed to have occurred within a relatively brief time interval (about 400 million years) of Mars history, spanning mostly the late Hesperian to very early Amazonian epochs. Faulting and graben formation in the region occurred in two early stages: one preceding and the other contemporaneous with the volcano's formation. Two late stages of graben formation occurred after volcanic activity had largely ended.

Based on Viking Orbiter images, the volcanic materials related to the formation and evolution of the volcano have been grouped into the Alba Patera Formation, which consists of lower, middle, and upper members. Members low in the stratigraphic sequence are older than those lying above, in accordance with Steno's law of superposition.

The oldest unit (lower member) corresponds to the broad lava apron surrounding the Alba Mons edifice. This unit is characterized by sets of low, flat-topped ridges that form a radial pattern extending for hundreds of kilometers to the west, north, and northeast of the main edifice. The ridges are interpreted to be lava flows, although the flow margins are now degraded and difficult to delineate. Broad lava flows with flat-topped ridges are characteristic features of lava flood provinces on Earth (e.g., Columbia River basalt) that were formed at high eruption rates. Thus, the earliest phase of volcanic activity at Alba Mons probably involved massive effusive eruptions of low viscosity lavas that formed the volcano's broad, flat apron. Lava flows of the apron unit straddle the early Hesperian-late Hesperian boundary, having erupted approximately 3700 to 3500 million years ago.

The middle unit, which is early Amazonian in age, makes up the flanks of the main Alba edifice and records a time of more focused effusive activity consisting of long tube- and channel-fed flows. Volcanic spreading occurred in a northward direction forming the two flanking lobes. (See Olympus Mons and Tharsis for a discussion of volcanic spreading on Mars.) Faulting and graben formation at Alba and Tantalus Fossae occurred penecontemporaneous with the lava flows. Any early explosive activity on the volcano may have occurred during the culmination of this middle phase of activity, which ended about 3400 million years ago.

The youngest unit, also early Amazonian, covers the summit plateau, dome, and caldera complex. This period of activity is characterized by relatively short-length sheet flows and construction of the summit dome and the large caldera. This phase ended with an eastward tilting of the summit dome, which may have initiated additional graben formation in Alba Fossae. The last volcanic features to form were the small shield and caldera at the summit. Much later, between about 1,000 and 500 million years ago, a final stage of faulting occurred that may have been related to dike emplacement and the formation of pit crater chains.

== Classification ==
The classification of the Alba Mons volcano is uncertain. Some workers describe it as a shield volcano, others as a lowland patera (in contrast to highland paterae, which are low-lying ancient volcanoes with furrowed ash deposits located in the southern Martian highlands), and still others consider it a one-of-a-kind volcanic structure unique to Mars. Some researchers have compared Alba Mons to coronae structures on the planet Venus. Alba Mons shares some characteristics with the Syrtis Major volcanic structure. (See Volcanism on Mars.) Both volcanoes are Hesperian in age, cover large areas, have very low relief, and large shallow calderas. Also like Alba, Syrtis Major displays ridged tube- and channel-fed lava flows. Because Alba Mons lies antipodal to the Hellas impact basin, a few researchers have conjectured that the volcano's formation may have been related to crustal weakening from the Hellas impact, which produced strong seismic waves that focused on the opposite side of the planet.

== See also ==
- Geography of Mars
- Geology of Mars
- List of mountains on Mars by height
- Tamu Massif
- Volcanism on Mars
