= Alba (Danish music ensemble) =

Alba are a Danish medieval music ensemble founded in 1992. The ensemble consists of the duo Agnethe Christensen (voice, kantele) and Poul Høxbro (taborpipe, percussion), or the trio with the harpist Helen Davis.

== Discography ==
The ensemble released four recordings on the Danish Classico label. The first three of these, together with a solo recording by Høxbro, were then re-released as a 4-for-1 box by Membran.

- Hildegard von Bingen. Music from Symphonia harmonia caelestium revelationum. O viriditas.. Agnethe Christensen, Poul Høxbro, Helen Davies with members of the vocal ensemble Con Fuoco CLASSCD 198:
- Songs of longing and lustful tunes. Cantigas de amigo. CLASSCD 225: Agnethe Christensen, Poul Høxbro
- Die tenschen Morder CLASSCD 335: Meister Rumelant, minnesinger at the Danehof court. Poul Høxbro, Agnethe Christensen, Miriam Andersén
- It barn er fød CLASSCD 395: Old Yuletide Songs from Scandinavia. Et barn er fodt i Bethlehem. Laus Virginis nati sonat. Personent hodie... Miriam Andersen, Poul Høxbro, Agnethe Christensen

Solo:

- Tu-tu pan-pan. CLASSCD 286: A piper's journey through medieval Europe. Got in vier elementen. Poul Høxbro
