= Alba (motorcycle) =

Motorcycle

The Alba motorcycle was manufactured at Stettin between 1919 and 1924 by Alfred Baruch. They featured four-stroke engines of 198cc, 247cc and 249cc capacity. Alba also manufactured three-wheeled delivery vans, as well as supplying engines to other manufacturers such as Huy and Teco. Although the company stopped manufacture in the mid-1920s, Alfred's son Manfred continued to supply spares up to the mid-1930s.

The company was formally established on 3 August 1918 as Alba-Werke GmbH in Stettin-Möhringen (now Szczecin, Poland). The brand name “Alba” is believed to derive from the initials of its founder, Albert Baruch. In addition to Huy and Teco, Alba engines were reportedly also used by manufacturers such as Mazzucchelli and Raakete. The company produced a three-wheeled delivery vehicle (’‘Lastendreirad’’) powered by a 195cc engine, which in Germany during 1925–1926 could be operated without a driving licence or vehicle tax. The firm declared bankruptcy in 1926 amid the difficult economic conditions of the period.Erwin Tragatsch, ‘‘Alle Motorräder 1894–1981’’, Motorbuch Verlag.
