= Autogestión Liberadora Buenos Aires =

The Autogestión Liberadora Buenos Aires (ALBA) is a left-wing political party in Argentina.

It contested the 2005 legislative elections for Buenos Aires Province and Buenos Aires City deputies in alliance with the Encuentro Amplio . The alliance performed badly in the election, gaining less than 1% in the capital and losing all its legislators at a national level.

== See also ==
- Political parties in Argentina
