= Alba (rabbit) =

Genetically modified "glowing" rabbit

Alba was a genetically modified "glowing" rabbit created as an artistic work claimed to be created by contemporary artist Eduardo Kac, produced by French geneticist Louis-Marie Houdebine.

Houdebine used the GFP gene found in the jellyfish, Aequorea victoria, that fluoresces green when exposed to blue light. This is a protein used in many standard biological experiments involving fluorescence. When Alba was exposed to such light, she would literally glow green — though photos by Kac showing the entire organism, including its hair, glowing a uniform green have had their veracity challenged.

Kac described Alba as an animal that did not exist in nature. In an article published in The Boston Globe, Houdebine said his group had already been using rabbits in its research, but that he was intrigued by Kac's desire to involve the public, and had ''never considered'' whether an entire animal would glow in the dark.

This article generated a global media scandal, which caused Houdebine to distance himself from Kac's work. All subsequent media articles present variations on Houdebine's disengagement effort. Houdebine himself said he agreed to participate in a debate, but the research facility where they had made the rabbits had not given consent. Kac continued to spread the images of 'his' Alba and became widely recognised as BioArtist, whereas Houdebine regretted being vague.

Alba's lifespan is an open question. In 2002, a US reporter called INRA (France), where Houdebine works, and was told that Alba had died. The reporter published an article stating that Alba was dead but the only evidence she provided was to quote Houdebine as saying: "I was informed one day that bunny was dead without any reason. So, rabbits die often. It was about 4 years old, which is a normal lifespan in our facilities."

In the 2007 European Molecular Biology Organization Members Meeting in Barcelona, Louis-Marie Houdebine presented in detail his version of the reality of 'the GFP rabbit story', placing emphasis on sensationalism by journalists and the TV media.
