= The Album (Dj Shah album) =

DJ Shah

Studio album by Dj Shah
- Released: October 2000
- Genres: Trance, house, electronica
- Length: 68:19
- Label: Session Group Records
- Producer: Roger-Pierre Shah

Dj Shah chronology
| DJ Shah (2000) | Songbook (2008) |

Singles from DJ Shah
- 1. "Claps" Released: 1999; 2. "Commandments (Die 10 Gebote)" Released: 1999; 3. "Riddim" Released: 2000

DJ Shah is the debut LP from German electronic composer and producer Roger-Pierre Shah.

== Track listing ==
| No. | Title | Writer(s) | Length |
|---|---|---|---|
| 1. | "Introduction" | Roger P. Shah | 2:06 |
| 2. | "Claps" | Roger P. Shah & Westböhm | 3:20 |
| 3. | "Stand By Me" | Leiber/Stoller/King | 5:19 |
| 4. | "Universe Of Love" | Roger P. Shah | 6:53 |
| 5. | "Commandments" | Roger P. Shah & Big Knows Al | 3:33 |
| 6. | "Watch Me Now" | Roger P. Shah, Westböhm, Fabulous, Master Luke & U-Turn | 3:55 |
| 7. | "Riddim" | Roger P. Shah | 3:39 |
| 8. | "Melomania" | Roger P. Shah | 3:39 |
| 9. | "B What U R" | Roger P. Shah | 4:34 |
| 10. | "Elements of Summer" | Roger P. Shah | 7:09 |
| 11. | "Bongomania" | Roger P. Shah | 8:14 |
| 12. | "Don't Cry" | Roger P. Shah & Westböhm | 7:50 |
| 13. | "A Dream is Coming True" | Roger P. Shah | 7:23 |
| 14. | "Riddim (One More Time)" | Roger P. Shah | 3:25 |
