= Isotheca =

Scientific classification
- Kingdom: Plantae
- Clade: Tracheophytes
- Clade: Angiosperms
- Clade: Eudicots
- Clade: Asterids
- Order: Lamiales
- Family: Acanthaceae
- Genus: Isotheca; Turrill (1922)
- Species: I. alba

Binomial name
- Isotheca alba Turrill (1922)

Genus of flowering plants

Isotheca is a monotypic genus of flowering plants belonging to the family Acanthaceae. The only species is Isotheca alba. It is a subshrub native to Mount Aripo on Trinidad and to northeastern Venezuela.
