= Jeckyll & Hyde (musicians) =

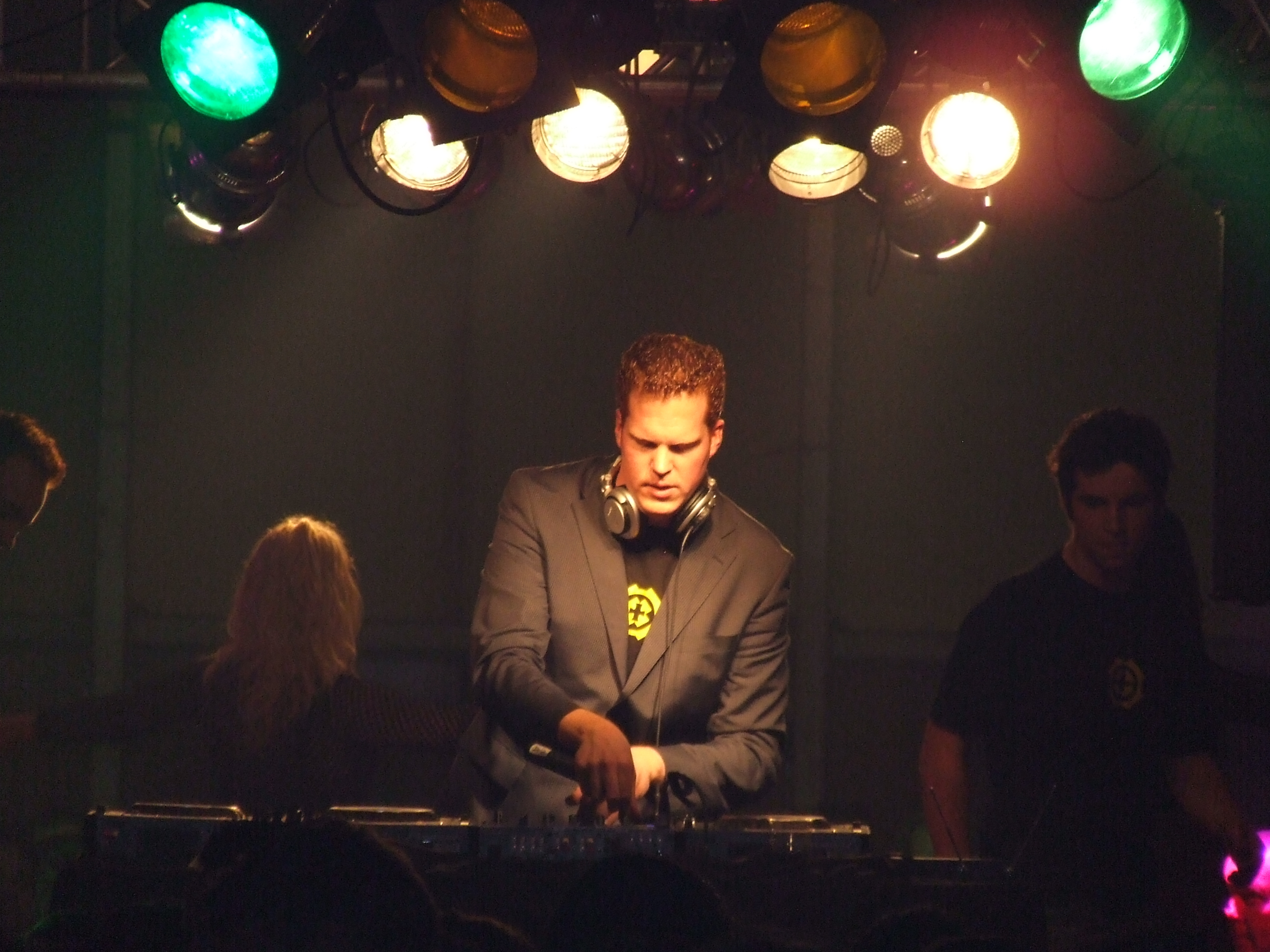

Jeckyll & Hyde is the stage name of the Dutch producer Maarten Vorwerk. His first commercial hit, "Frozen Flame", reached #11 on the Dutch Top 40 charts. The second single from The Album, "Freefall", reached #1 in the Dutch Top 40 charts, making it the first instrumental #1 hit in the Netherlands since 1995. "Time Flies", the third single, has also been receiving major airplay on Dutch TV and radio stations.

== Discography ==
- Kick This One (Vinyl, 2005)
- Precious Dreamer (Vinyl, 2005)
- Frozen Flame (EP, 2006)
- Freefall (EP, 2007)
- Time Flies (EP, 2007)
- The Album (Album, 2007)
- Spring Break / Break It Down (EP, 2009)

== Reception ==
Jeckyll & Hyde received two TMF Award nominations in 2007 - the TMF Party Award and the TMF Radio Hit Award - winning the TMF Party Award.
The origin of the name Jeckyll & Hyde comes from the book Strange Case of Dr Jeckyll & Mr Hyde from Robert Louis Stevenson published in 1886.
