= Alba de Cerrato =

Coordinates: 41°49′N 4°22′W

- municipality
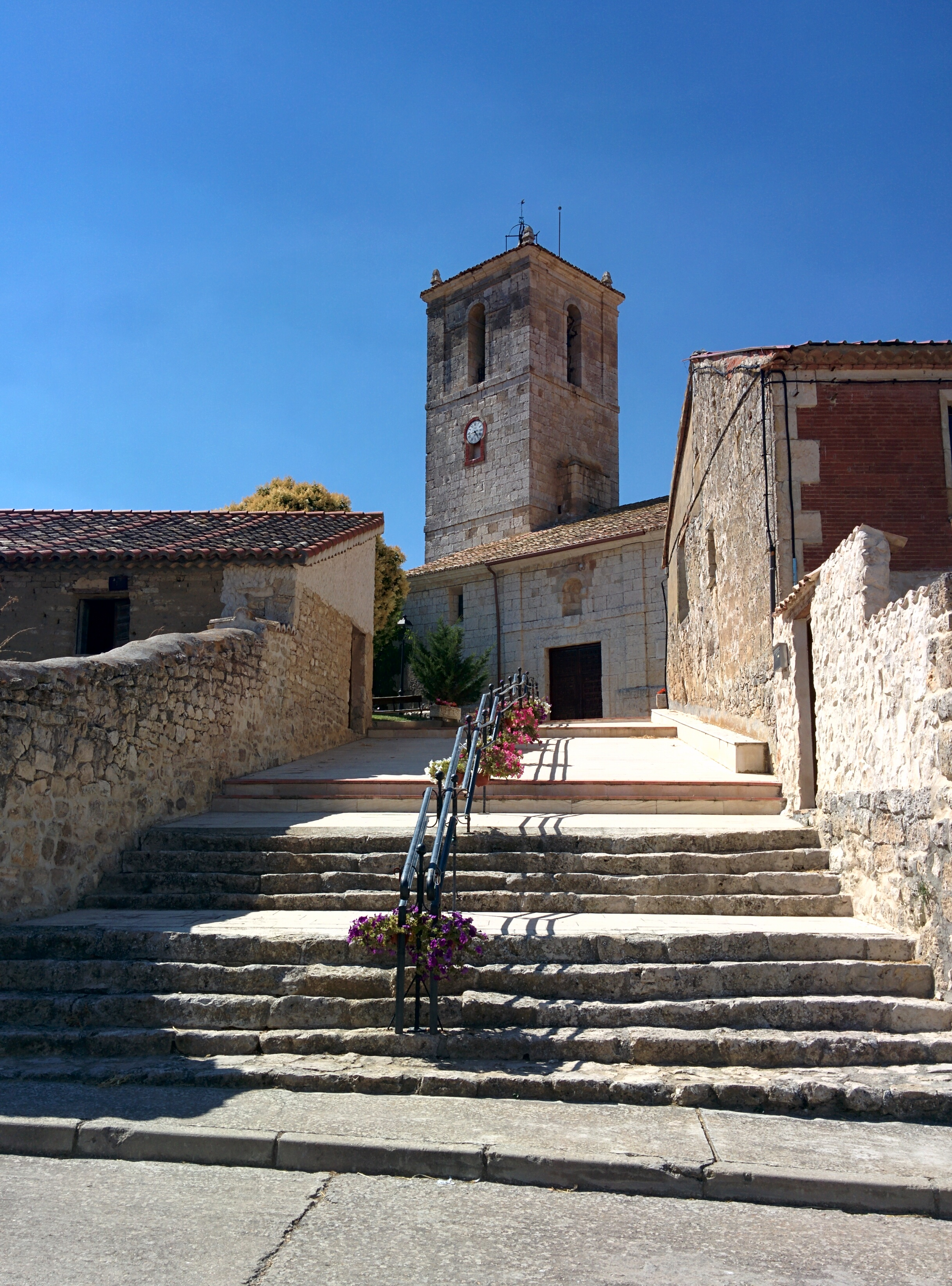

- Flag Coat of arms
- Interactive map of Alba de Cerrato
- Country: Spain
- Autonomous community: Castile and León
- Province: Palencia
- Municipality: Alba de Cerrato

Area
  - Total: 35 km^{2} (14 sq mi)

Population (2025-01-01)
  - Total: 80
  - Density: 2.3/km^{2} (5.9/sq mi)
- Time zone: UTC+1 (CET)
  - Summer (DST): UTC+2 (CEST)
- Website: Official website

Alba de Cerrato is a municipality located in the province of Palencia, Castile and León, Spain.

According to the 2004 census (INE), the municipality had a population of 99 inhabitants.
