= The Album (Jeckyll & Hyde album) =

Studio album by Jeckyll & Hyde
- Released: (Netherlands) 18 May 2007
- Genre: Jumpstyle
- Length: 1:02:33
- Label: Digidance
- Producers: Jeckyll & Hyde

The Album is the 2007 debut album by the Dutch duo & Jump-musicians Jeckyll & Hyde, released on 18 May 2007 in the Netherlands through label Digidance. Two singles, "Frozen Flame" and "Free fall", have been released in support of the album, and a third track, "Time Flies", has also received airplay.

== Track listing ==
1. "Intro" – 1:54
2. "La Dans Macabre" – 4:02
3. "Lost in Space" – 3:23
4. "Frozen Flame" – 3:34
5. "The Lost Files" – 3:50
6. "The Flipside" – 3:21
7. "Precious Dreamer" – 4:25
8. "Freefall" – 3:28
9. "Frozen Flame" [Wezz & Fisher Extended Remix] – 7:29
10. "Lost in Time" – 4:03
11. "Kick This One" – 4:12
12. "In Trance Of" – 3:41
13. "Time Flies" – 3:40
14. "End of Time" – 3:36
15. "Play It Loud" [Noise Provider Remix] – 4:13
16. "Universal Nation" (Bonus Track) – 3:42

== Charts ==
=== Weekly charts ===
Chart (2007)	Peak position
Dutch Albums (Album Top 100)	7

=== Year-end charts ===
Chart (2007)	Position
Dutch Albums (Album Top 100)	85
