= Tantalus Fossae =

Fossae on Mars

- Tantalus Fossae based on THEMIS day-time image
- Location: Arcadia quadrangle
- Coordinates: 50.9°N 97.5°W
- Length: 2,400 km
- Naming: Classical albedo feature

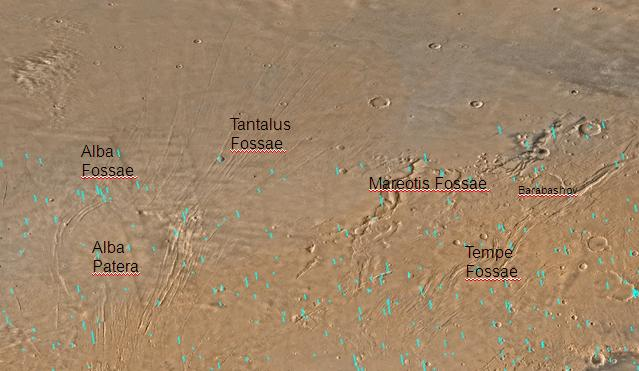
Map of Arcadia quadrangle with major features labeled. Several large cracks called Fossae are in this area.

Tantalus Fossae is a group of troughs in the Arcadia quadrangle of Mars, located at 50.9° north latitude and 97.5° west longitude. They are about 2,400 km long and was named after an albedo feature at 35N, 110W. Troughs like this one are called fossae on Mars.

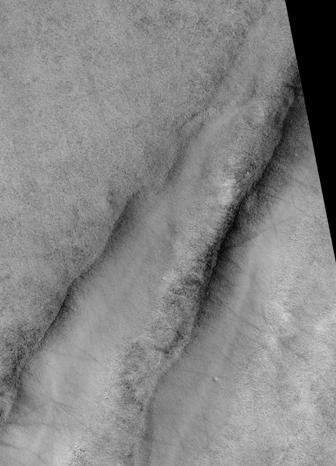
Tantalus Fossae, as seen by HiRISE. Click on image to see dust devil tracks.
