= Albus Cavus =

Art collective in New Jersey, US

Coordinates: 40.4903°N 74.4327°W

Albus Cavus is a collective of artists and educators who transform public spaces with creativity. Originally, it was established as an underground art gallery and presentation space in New Brunswick, New Jersey, United States. Albus Cavus, which means "white cave" in Latin, was originally started in September 2002 as a small basement exhibit space that gradually grew into a large artist collective that spans far beyond New Jersey. By forming a network of relationships that includes the city government, schools, and businesses, it provides the artists with projects that benefit the local community. Public art installations and murals beautify the neighborhoods and provide the residents with the feeling of ownership and responsibility for their surroundings.

Albus Cavus aims to make art readily accessible to all. This simple idea at the beginning has become the primary mission. The artists working with Albus Cavus recognize the new needs for modern art that educates and enlightens the audience. And the viewers do not play the passive role of critics but become actively involved in the artwork creation.

== Public works ==
Albus Cavus has worked together with the city of New Brunswick to commission artists to paint murals on George Street and New Street, the city's major streets.

The New Brunswick community arts council and Albus Cavus are working together to create aeries of murals on a path along the Raritan River on sections up to 6 feet high and 15 feet long.

== History ==
- September 2002 - the first exhibit in the basement gallery - birth of Albus Cavus.
- December 2003 - painted windows by Leon Rainbow, basement closes
- April 2004 - the first exhibit at the New Brunswick Train Station
- March 2005 - the first exhibit in Yoga Vayu Studio
- April 2005 - Streets 2k5 + 1st Annual Street Art Film Fest
- October 2005 - Albus Cavus Volunteers Tutor for the Arts program is established
- May 2005 - Albus Cavus is represented in the North Brunswick Community Arts Council
- December 2005 - 430 gallery opens (currently not active)
- Summer 2006 - the first series of murals
- November 2006 - 2nd Annual Street Art Film Fest
- Spring 2007 - Raritan River Art Walk
