= Alba (1907 automobile) =

- Native name: Alba Fabbrica Automobili S.A. Alba Automobilwerke Aktiengesellschaft
- Industry: Automobile
- Founded: 3 October 1906
- Founder: Ettore Modiano Edmondo Richetti Nicolò Sevastopulo
- Defunct: 25 September 1908
- Fate: Defunct
- Headquarters: San Sabba, Trieste, Italy
- Number of locations: 1
- Products: 18/24 HP and 35/40 HP

Alba was an Italians car manufacturer based in Trieste, which started operations in 1906 with two companies

named Alba Fabbrica Automobili S.A. and Alba Automobilwerke Aktiengesellschaft. The company was founded by automobile enthusiasts from influential families of Trieste, Edmondo Richetti, Ettore Modiano and others. The company planned to build two models of car, firstly one with 18-24hp output and the second with 35-40hp output, but only the second model made it to production with a 6,868 cc inline 4-cylinder engine and a 4 speed manual gearbox. It was showcased at the Paris Motor Show in 1907 where the model was praised by the visitors. Despite the attention and appreciation the model received, the company failed to mass-produce the vehicle and the company closed its operations in 1908. At the time of liquidation the company had 10 units of the 35-40hp model car, a 20,000 sq ft production plant in San Sabba and 150 employees.

== See also ==
- SCAT
- S.P.A.
- Lancia
- Aquila Italiana
- Brixia-Zust
