= Arcadia quadrangle =

Map of Mars

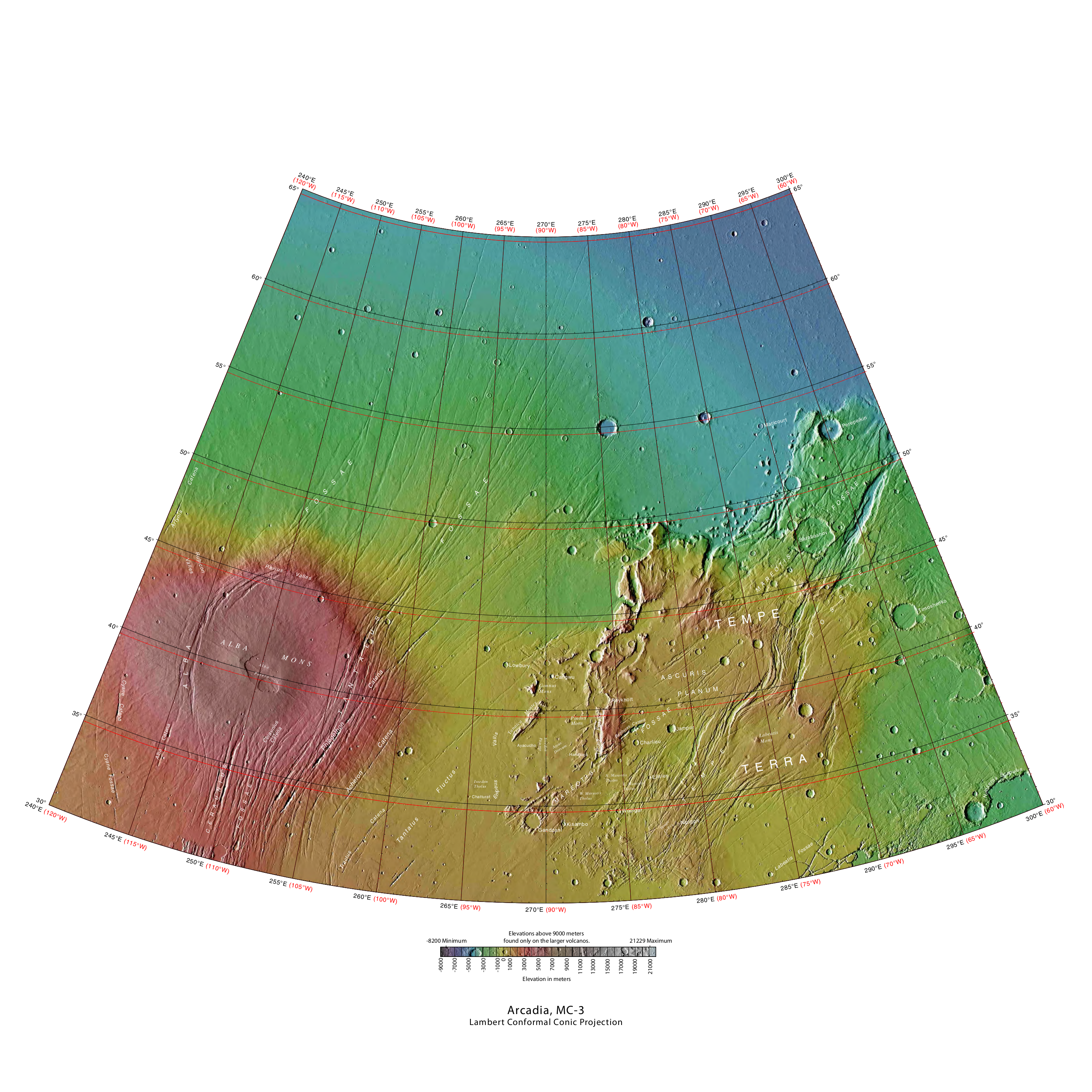
- Elevation map of Arcadia quadrangle from Mars Orbiter Laser Altimeter (MOLA) data.
- Coordinates: 47.5°N 90°W

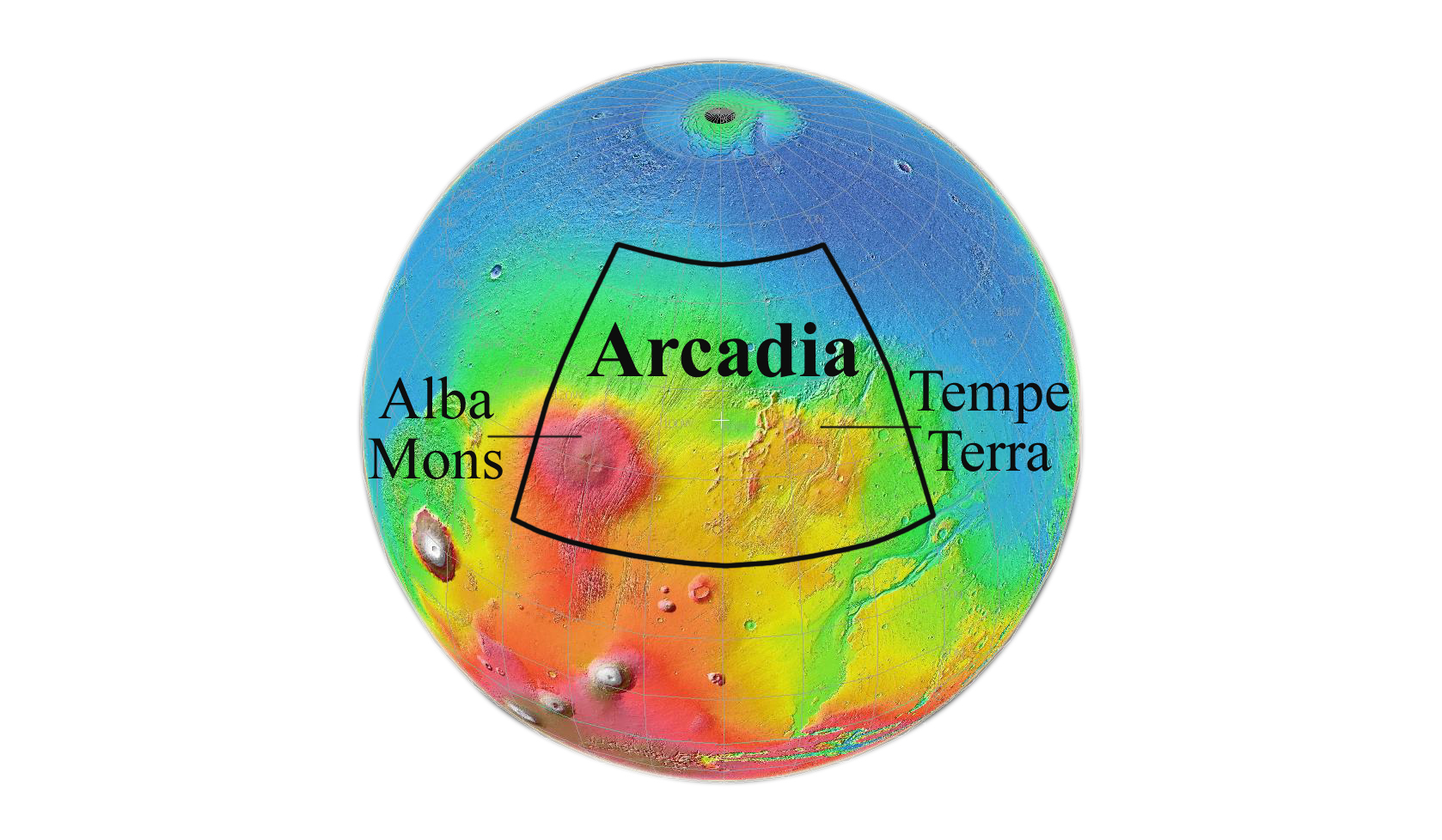
Location of Arcadia quadrangle. The Arcadia quadrangle is in the northcentral part of the Martian northwestern hemisphere, in the northern part of the Tharsis volcanic province.

The Arcadia quadrangle is one of a series of 30 quadrangle maps of Mars used by the United States Geological Survey (USGS) Astrogeology Research Program. The quadrangle is located in the north-central portion of Mars’ western hemisphere and covers 240° to 300° east longitude (60° to 120° west longitude) and 30° to 65° north latitude. The quadrangle uses a Lambert conformal conic projection at a nominal scale of 1:5,000,000 (1:5M). The Arcadia quadrangle is also referred to as MC-3 (Mars Chart-3). The name comes from a mountainous region in southern Greece. It was adopted by IAU, in 1958.

The southern and northern borders of the Arcadia quadrangle are approximately 3,065 km and 1,500 km wide, respectively. The north to south distance is about 2,050 km (slightly less than the length of Greenland). The quadrangle covers an approximate area of 4.9 million square km, or a little over 3% of Mars’ surface area. The region called Tempe Terra is in the Arcadia quadrangle.

Several features found in this quadrangle are interesting, especially gullies which are believed to be caused by relatively recent flows of liquid water. Dark slope streaks and dust devil tracks can have a striking appearance.

== Origin of name ==
Arcadia is the name of a telescopic albedo feature located at 45° north latitude (N) and 260° east longitude (E) on Mars. The feature was named after a mountainous region in southern Greece. The name was approved by the International Astronomical Union (IAU) in 1958.

== Physiography and geology ==
The quadrangle contains Alba Patera, the largest volcano (by area and volume) in the Solar System, Mareotis Fossae and Tempe as well as Tempe Terra, a highly fractured block of ancient crust about the size of Alaska.

== See also ==
- Dark slope streak
- Dust Devil Tracks
- Fossa (geology)
- Fretted terrain
- Glaciers on Mars
- HiRISE
- HiWish program
- Impact crater
- Linear ridge networks
- Lobate debris apron
- Martian Gullies
- Perepelkin (Martian crater)

MC-01 Mare Boreum (features)
MC-02 Diacria (features)		MC-03 Arcadia (features)	MC-04 Acidalium (features)	MC-05 Ismenius Lacus (features)		MC-06 Casius (features)	MC-07 Cebrenia (features)
MC-08 Amazonis (features)	MC-09 Tharsis (features)	MC-10 Lunae Palus (features)	MC-11 Oxia Palus (features)	MC-12 Arabia (features)	MC-13 Syrtis Major (features)	MC-14 Amenthes (features)	MC-15 Elysium (features)
MC-16 Memnonia (features)	MC-17 Phoenicis Lacus (features)	MC-18 Coprates (features)	MC-19 Margaritifer Sinus (features)	MC-20 Sinus Sabaeus (features)	MC-21 Iapygia (features)	MC-22 Mare Tyrrhenum (features)	MC-23 Aeolis (features)
MC-24 Phaethontis (features)		MC-25 Thaumasia (features)	MC-26 Argyre (features)	MC-27 Noachis (features)		MC-28 Hellas (features)	MC-29 Eridania (features)
MC-30 Mare Australe (features)
