= Areography =

Delineation and characterization of Martian regions

A high-resolution colorized map of Mars based on Viking orbiter images. Surface frost and water ice fog brighten the impact basin Hellas to the right of lower center; Syrtis Major just above it is darkened by winds that sweep dust off its basaltic surface. Residual north and south polar ice caps are shown at upper and lower right as they appear in early summer and at minimum size, respectively.

Areography, also known as the geography of Mars, is a subfield of planetary science that entails the delineation and characterization of regions on Mars. Areography is mainly focused on what is called physical geography on Earth; that is the distribution of physical features across Mars and their cartographic representations. In April 2023, The New York Times reported an updated global map of Mars based on images from the Hope spacecraft. A related, but much more detailed, global Mars map was released by NASA on 16 April 2023.

== History ==
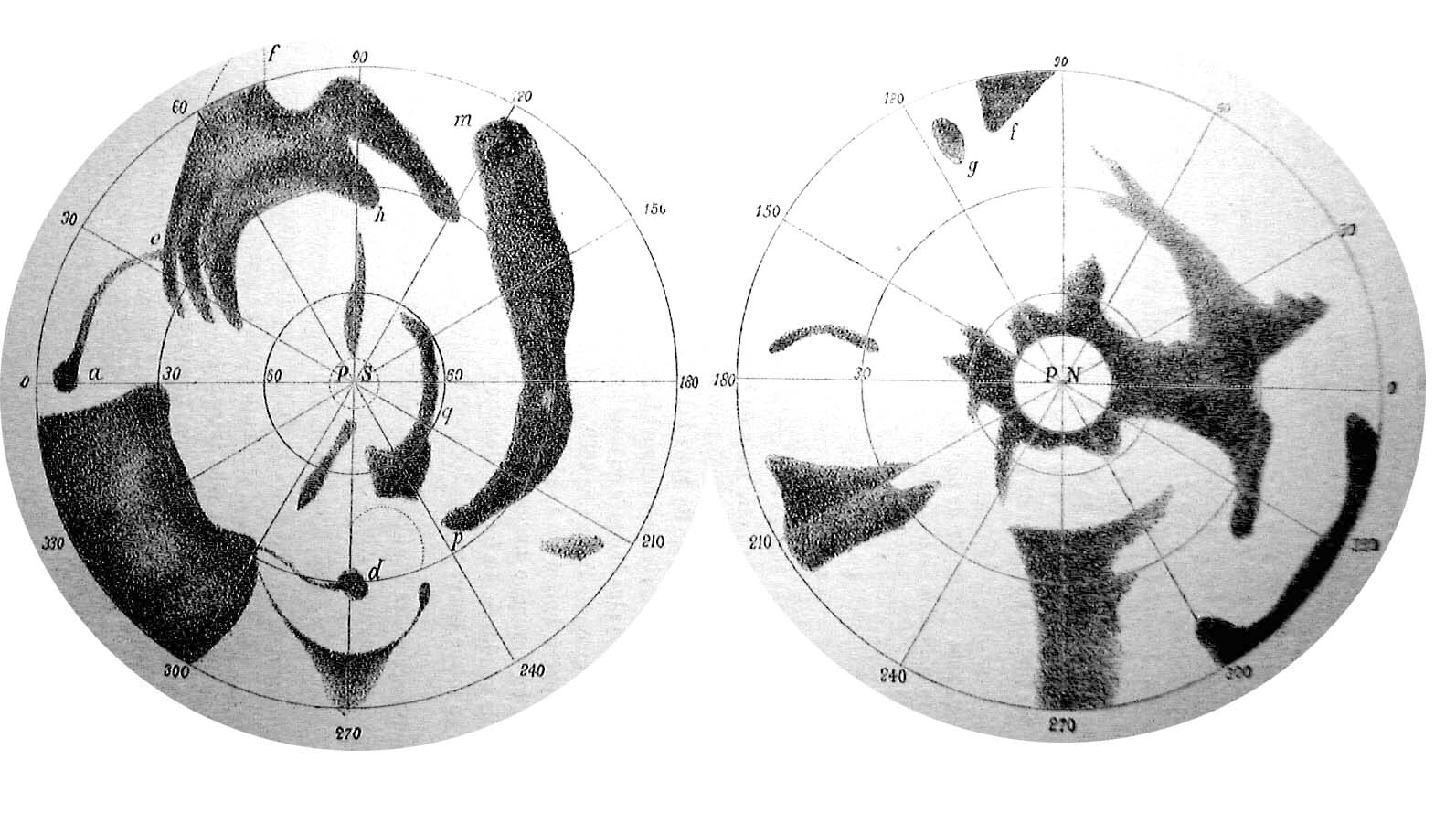
The first map of Mars by Madler-Beer

The first detailed observations of Mars were from ground-based telescopes. The history of these observations are marked by the oppositions of Mars, when the planet is closest to Earth and hence is most easily visible, which occur every couple of years. Even more notable are the perihelic oppositions of Mars, when Mars is near its perihelion and thus even closer to Earth; these occur at intervals of 15 or 17 Earth years.

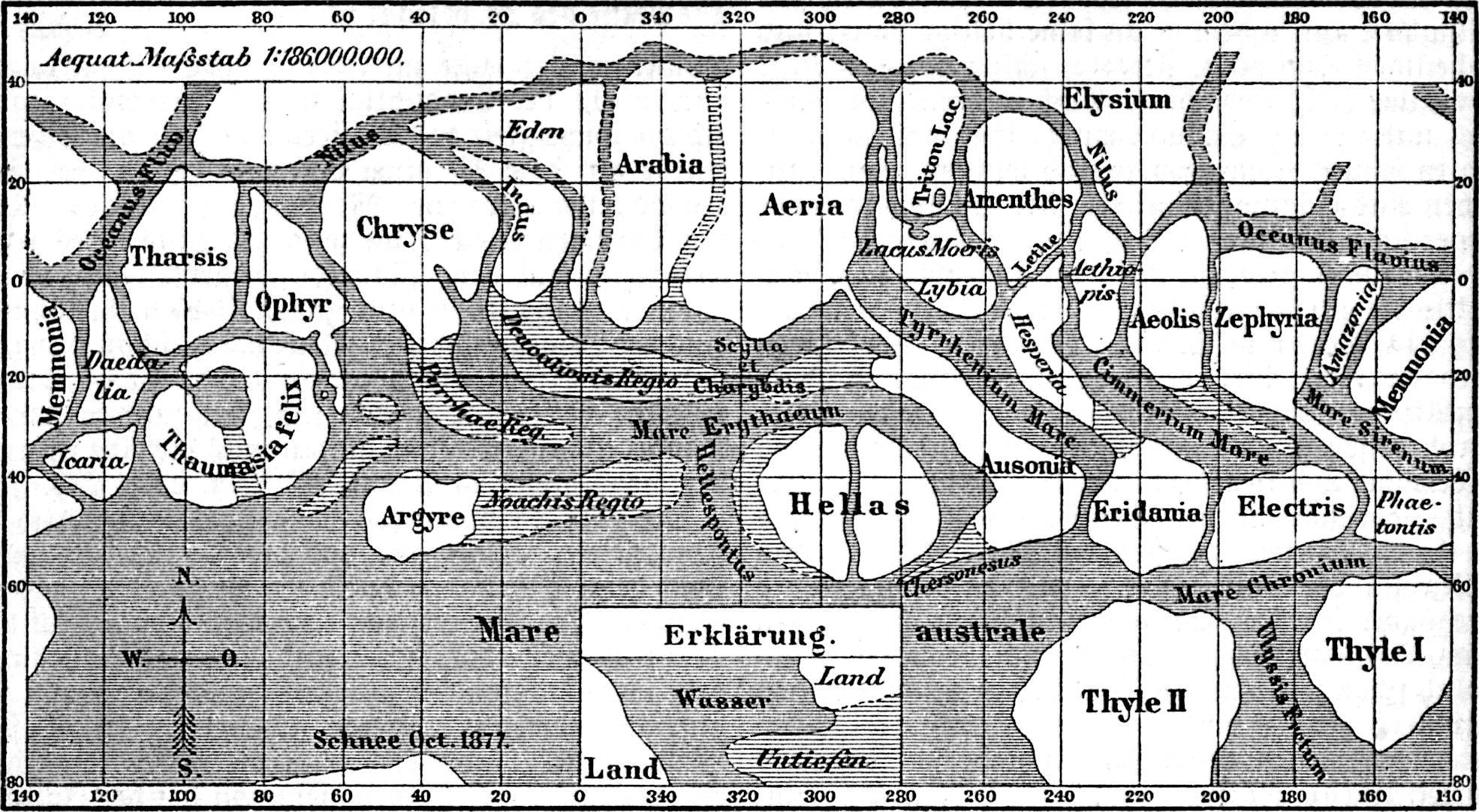
An 1877 map of Mars by Giovanni Schiaparelli. North is at the top of this map. In most maps of Mars drawn before space exploration the convention among astronomers was to put south at the top because the telescopic image of a planet is inverted.

In September 1877, (a perihelic opposition of Mars occurred on September 5), Italian astronomer Giovanni Schiaparelli published the first detailed map of Mars. These maps notably contained features he called canali ("channels"), that were later shown to be an optical illusion. These canali were supposedly long straight lines on the surface of Mars to which he gave names of famous rivers on Earth. His term was popularly mistranslated as canals, and so started the Martian canal controversy.

Following these observations, it was a long-held belief that Mars contained vast seas and vegetation. It was not until spacecraft visited the planet during NASA's Mariner missions in the 1960s that these myths were dispelled. Some maps of Mars were made using the data from these missions, but it wasn't until the Mars Global Surveyor mission, launched in 1996 and ending in late 2006, that complete, extremely detailed maps were obtained.

== Cartography and geodesy ==
Cartography is the art, science, and technology of making maps. Geodesy is the science of measuring the shape, orientation, and gravity of Earth and, by extension, other planetary bodies. There are many established techniques specific to Earth that allow us to convert the 2D curved surface into 2D planes to facilitate mapping. To facilitate this on Mars, projections, coordinate systems, and datums needed to be established. Today, the United States Geological Survey defines thirty cartographic quadrangles for the surface of Mars. These can be seen below.

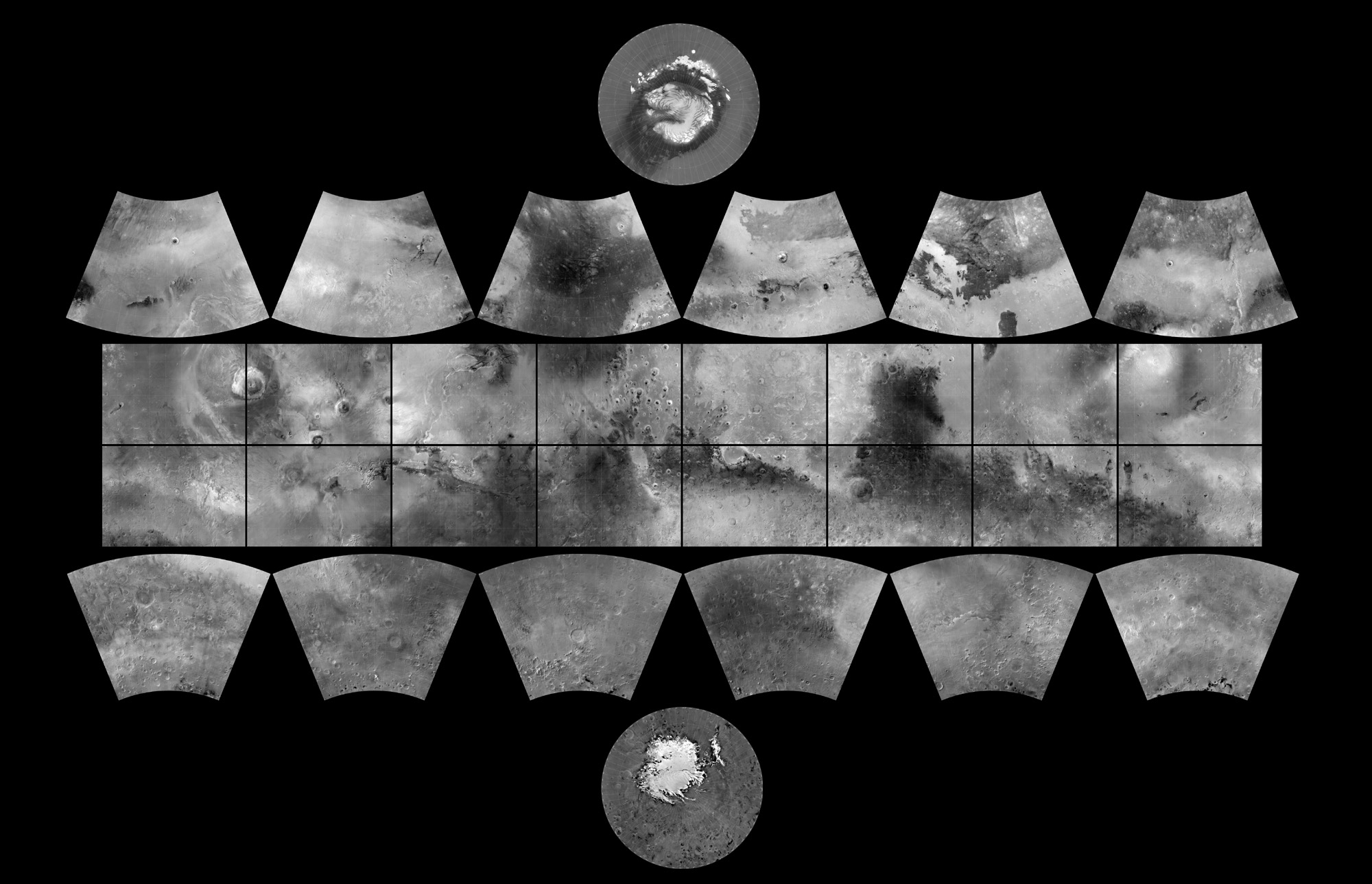
Clickable image of the 30 cartographic quadrangles of Mars, defined by the USGS. Quadrangle numbers (beginning with MC for "Mars Chart") and names link to the corresponding articles. North is at the top; 0°N 180°W is at the far left on the equator. The map images were taken by the Mars Global Surveyor.

=== Zero elevation ===
On Earth, the zero elevation datum is based on sea level (the geoid). Since Mars has no oceans and hence no 'sea level', it is convenient to define an arbitrary zero-elevation level or "vertical datum" for mapping the surface, called areoid.

The datum for Mars was defined initially in terms of a constant atmospheric pressure. From the Mariner 9 mission up until 2001, this was chosen as 610.5 Pa (6.105 mbar), on the basis that below this pressure liquid water can never be stable (i.e., the triple point of water is at this pressure). This value is only 0.6% of the pressure at sea level on Earth. Note that the choice of this value does not mean that liquid water does exist below this elevation, just that it could were the temperature to exceed 273.16 K (0.01 degrees C, 32.018 degrees F).

In 2001, Mars Orbiter Laser Altimeter data led to a new convention of zero elevation defined as the equipotential surface (gravitational plus rotational) whose average value at the equator is equal to the mean radius of the planet.

=== Zero latitude ===
The origin of latitude is Mars's mean equator, defined perpendicularly to its mean axis of rotation, removing periodic wobbles.

=== Zero longitude ===
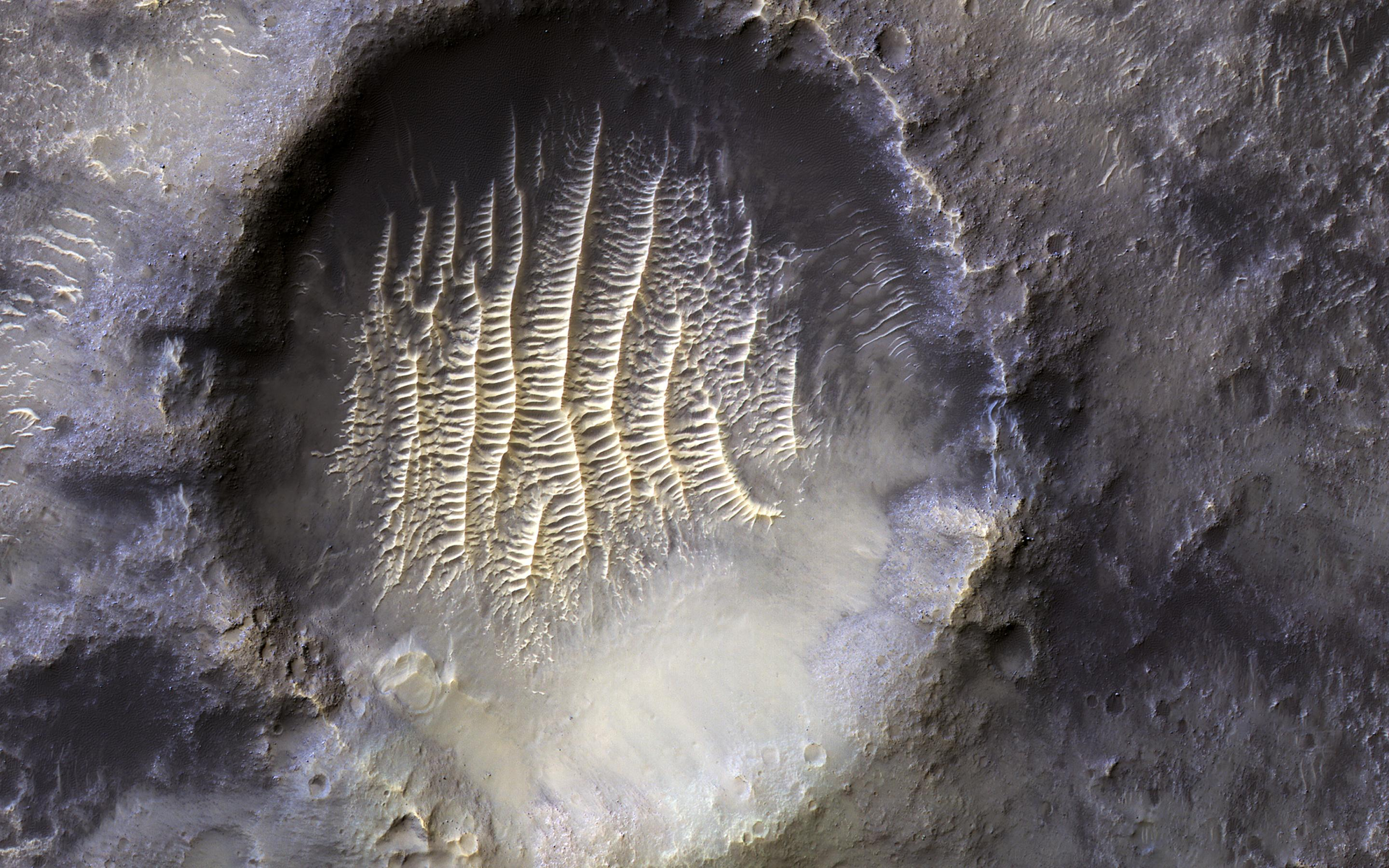
Airy-0 crater, October 2021

Mars's equator is defined by its rotation, but the location of its prime meridian was specified, as is Earth's, by choice of an arbitrary point which later observers accepted. The German astronomers Wilhelm Beer and Johann Heinrich Mädler selected a small circular feature in the Sinus Meridiani ('Middle Bay' or 'Meridian Bay') as a reference point when they produced the first systematic chart of Mars features in 1830–1832. In 1877, their choice was adopted as the prime meridian by the Italian astronomer Giovanni Schiaparelli when he began work on his notable maps of Mars. In 1909 ephemeris-makers decided that it was more important to maintain continuity of the ephemerides as a guide to observations and this definition was "virtually abandoned".

After the Mariner spacecraft provided extensive imagery of Mars, in 1972 the Mariner 9 Geodesy / Cartography Group proposed that the prime meridian pass through the center of a small 500 m diameter crater, named Airy-0, located in Sinus Meridiani along the meridian line of Beer and Mädler, thus defining 0.0° longitude with a precision of 0.001°. This model used the planetographic control point network developed by Merton Davies of the RAND Corporation.

As radiometric techniques increased the precision with which objects could be located on the surface of Mars, the center of a 500 m circular crater was considered to be insufficiently precise for exact measurements. The IAU Working Group on Cartographic Coordinates and Rotational Elements, therefore, recommended setting the longitude of the Viking 1 lander – for which there was extensive radiometric tracking data – as marking the standard longitude of 47.95137° west. This definition maintains the position of the center of Airy-0 at 0° longitude, within the tolerance of current cartographic uncertainties.

== Topography ==
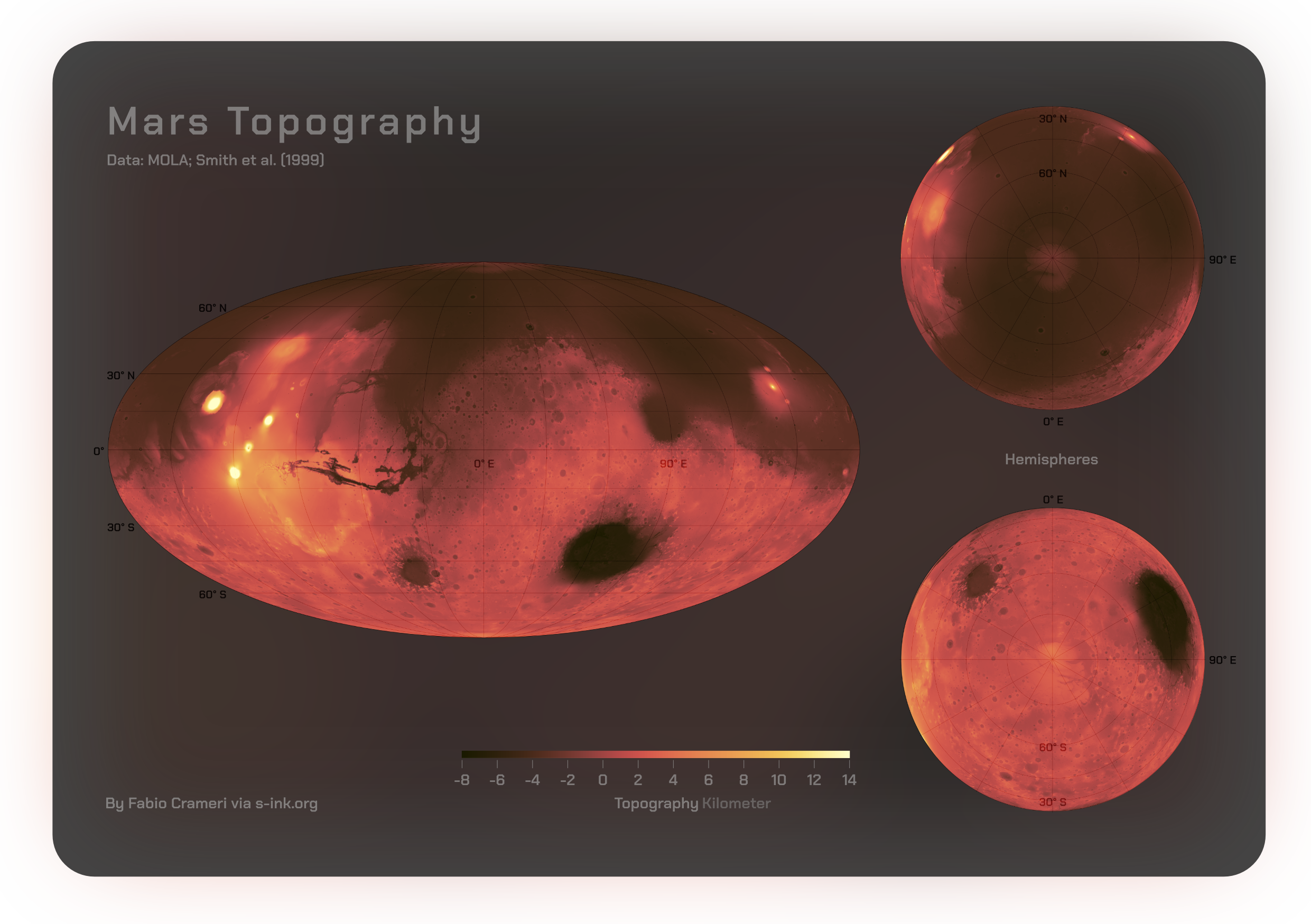
A high resolution topographic map of Mars based on the Mars Global Surveyor laser altimeter research led by Maria Zuber and David Smith. North is at the top. Notable features include the Tharsis volcanoes in the west (including Olympus Mons), Valles Marineris to the east of Tharsis, and Hellas basin in the southern hemisphere.

A STL 3D model of Mars with 20× elevation exaggeration using data from the Mars Global Surveyor Mars Orbiter Laser Altimeter

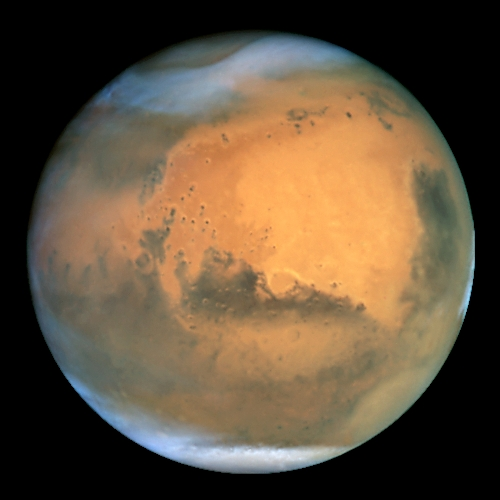
Mars, 2001, with the southern polar ice cap visible on the bottom

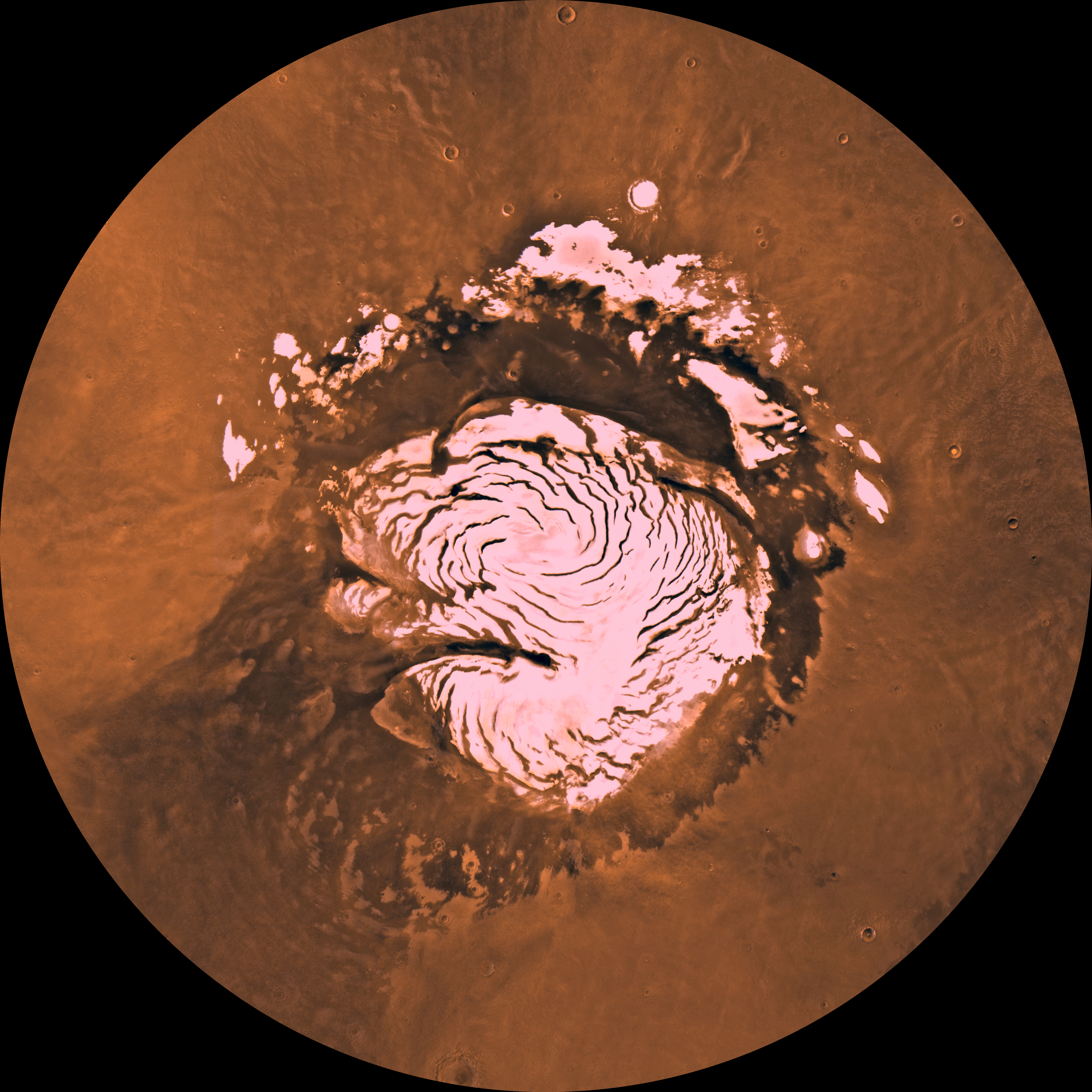
North Polar region with icecap

Across a whole planet, generalisation is not possible, and the geography of Mars varies considerably. The dichotomy of Martian topography is striking: northern plains flattened by lava flows contrast with the southern highlands, pitted and cratered by ancient impacts. The surface of Mars as seen from Earth is consequently divided into two kinds of areas, with differing albedo.

The paler plains covered with dust and sand rich in reddish iron oxides were once thought of as Martian 'continents' and given names like Arabia Terra (land of Arabia) or Amazonis Planitia (Amazonian plain). The dark features were thought to be seas, hence their names Mare Erythraeum, Mare Sirenum and Aurorae Sinus. The largest dark feature seen from Earth is Syrtis Major Planum.

The shield volcano, Olympus Mons (Mount Olympus), rises 22 km above the surrounding volcanic plains, and is the highest known mountain on any planet in the Solar System. It is in a vast upland region called Tharsis, which contains several large volcanos. See list of mountains on Mars. The Tharsis region of Mars also has the Solar System's largest canyon system, Valles Marineris or the Mariner Valley, which is 4,000 km long and 7 km deep. Mars is also scarred by countless impact craters. The largest of these is the Hellas impact basin. See list of craters on Mars.

Mars has two permanent polar ice caps, the northern one located at Planum Boreum and the southern one at Planum Australe.

The difference between Mars's highest and lowest points is nearly 30 km (from the top of Olympus Mons at an altitude of 21.2 km to Badwater Crater at the bottom of the Hellas impact basin at an altitude of 8.2 km below the datum). In comparison, the difference between Earth's highest and lowest points (Mount Everest and the Mariana Trench) is only 19.7 km. Combined with the planets' different radii, this means Mars is nearly three times "rougher" than Earth.

The International Astronomical Union's Working Group for Planetary System Nomenclature is responsible for naming Martian surface features.

=== Martian dichotomy ===
Observers of Martian topography will notice a dichotomy between the northern and southern hemispheres. Most of the northern hemisphere is flat, with few impact craters, and lies below the conventional 'zero elevation' level. In contrast, the southern hemisphere is mountains and highlands, mostly well above zero elevation. The two hemispheres differ in elevation by 1 to 3 km. The border separating the two areas is very interesting to geologists.

One distinctive feature is the fretted terrain. It contains mesas, knobs, and flat-floored valleys having walls about a mile high. Around many of the mesas and knobs are lobate debris aprons that have been shown to be rock-covered glaciers.

Other interesting features are the large river valleys and outflow channels that cut through the dichotomy.

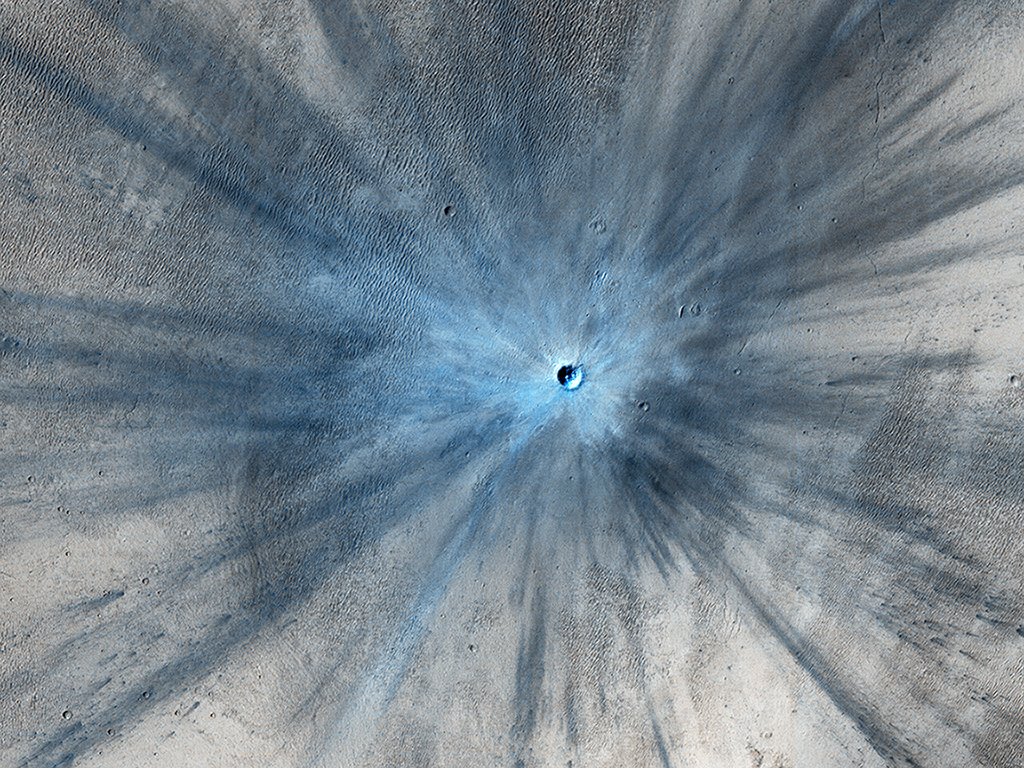
A fresh impact crater on Mars 3.7°N 53.4°E, November 2013

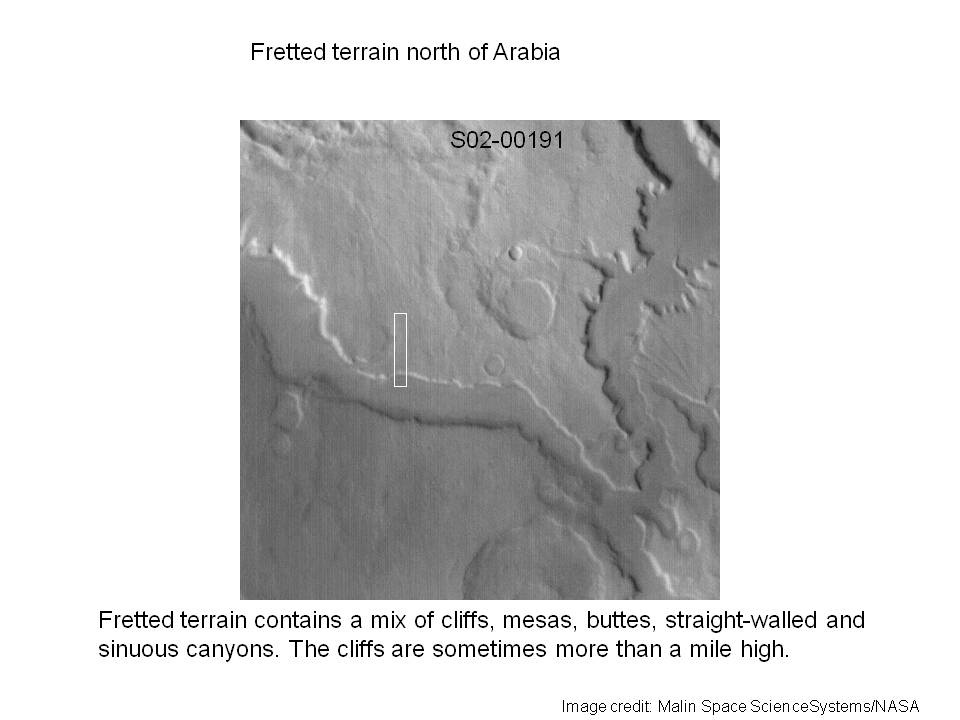
Fretted terrain of Ismenius Lacus showing flat floored valleys and cliffs. Photo taken with Mars Orbiter Camera (MOC) on the Mars Global Surveyor.

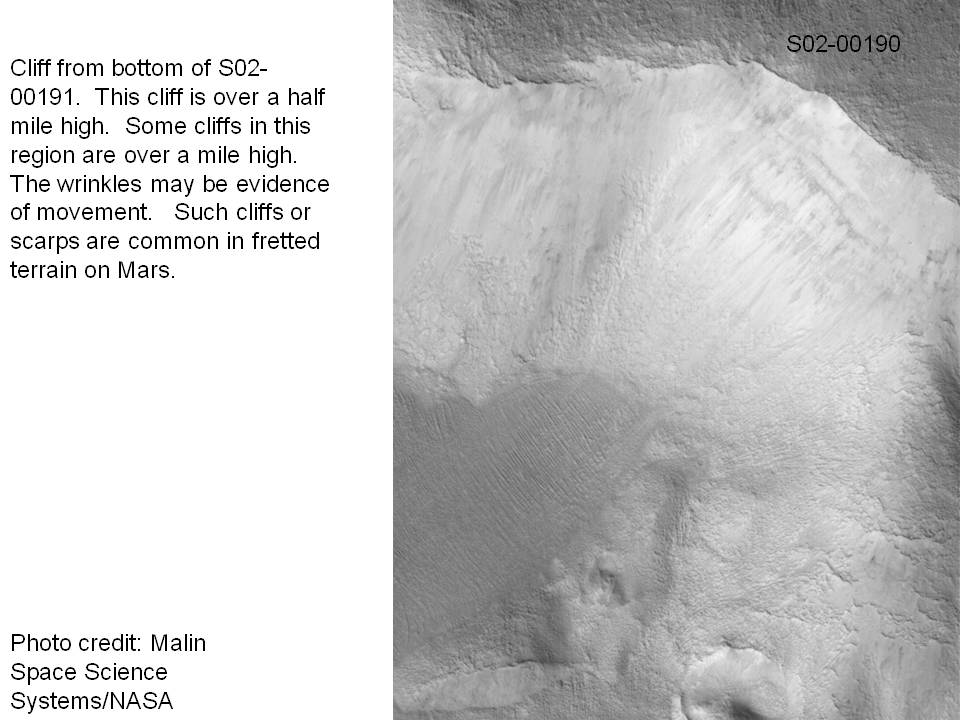
Enlargement of the photo on the left showing cliff. Photo taken with high resolution camera of Mars Global Surveyor (MGS).

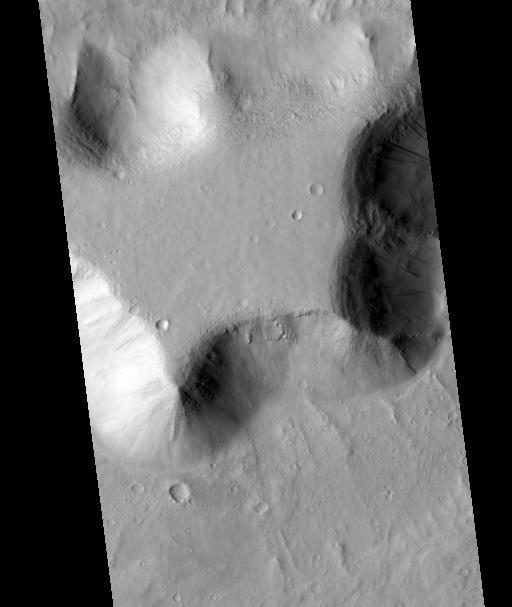
View of lobate debris apron along a slope. Image located in Arcadia quadrangle.

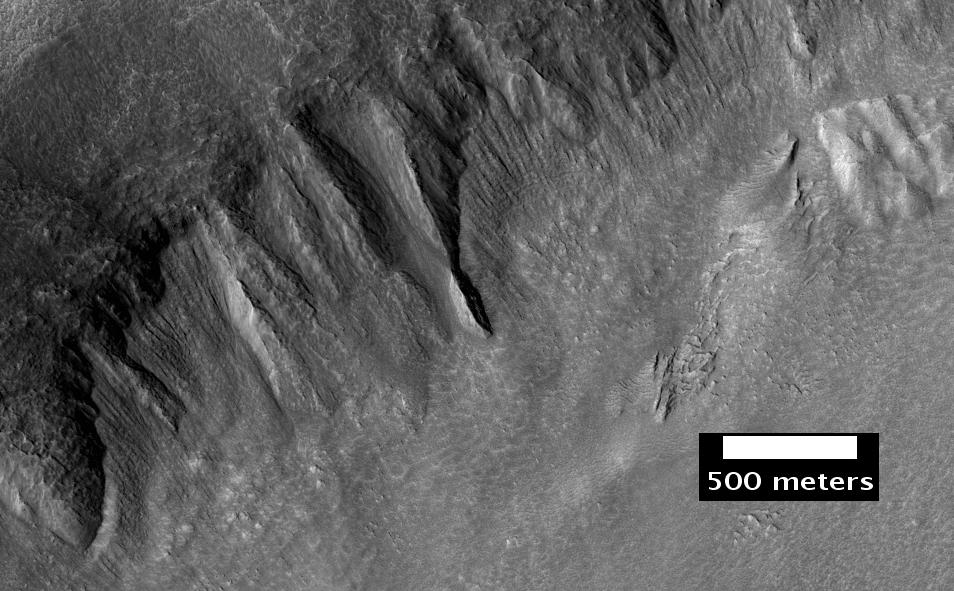
Place where a lobate debris apron begins. Note stripes which indicate movement. Image located in Ismenius Lacus quadrangle.

The northern lowlands comprise about one-third of the surface of Mars and are relatively flat, with occasional impact craters. The other two-thirds of the Martian surface are the southern highlands. The difference in elevation between the hemispheres is dramatic. Because of the density of impact craters, scientists believe the southern hemisphere to be far older than the northern plains. Much of heavily cratered southern highlands date back to the period of heavy bombardment, the Noachian.

Multiple hypotheses have been proposed to explain the differences. The three most commonly accepted are a single mega-impact, multiple impacts, and endogenic processes such as mantle convection. Both impact-related hypotheses involve processes that could have occurred before the end of the primordial bombardment, implying that the crustal dichotomy has its origins early in the history of Mars.

The giant impact hypothesis, originally proposed in the early 1980s, was met with skepticism due to the impact area's non-radial (elliptical) shape, where a circular pattern would be stronger support for impact by larger object(s). But a 2008 study provided additional research that supports a single giant impact. Using geologic data, researchers found support for the single impact of a large object hitting Mars at approximately a 45-degree angle. Additional evidence analyzing Martian rock chemistry for post-impact upwelling of mantle material would further support the giant impact theory.

== Nomenclature ==
=== Early nomenclature ===
A 1962 map of Mars published by the U.S. Aeronautical Chart and Information Center, showing canals snaking through the Martian landscape. At the time, the existence of canals was still highly controversial as no close-up pictures of Mars had been taken (until Mariner 4's flyby in 1965).

Although better remembered for mapping the Moon starting in 1830, Johann Heinrich Mädler and Wilhelm Beer were the first "areographers". They started off by establishing once and for all that most of the surface features were permanent, and pinned down Mars's rotation period. In 1840, Mädler combined ten years of observations and drew the first map of Mars ever made. Rather than giving names to the various markings they mapped, Beer and Mädler simply designated them with letters; Meridian Bay (Sinus Meridiani) was thus feature "a".

Over the next twenty years or so, as instruments improved and the number of observers also increased, various Martian features acquired a hodge-podge of names. To give a couple of examples, Solis Lacus was known as the "Oculus" (the Eye), and Syrtis Major was usually known as the "Hourglass Sea" or the "Scorpion". In 1858, it was also dubbed the "Atlantic Canale" by the Jesuit astronomer Angelo Secchi. Secchi commented that it "seems to play the role of the Atlantic which, on Earth, separates the Old Continent from the New;" this was the first time the fateful canale, which in Italian can mean either "channel" or "canal", had been applied to Mars.

In 1867, Richard Anthony Proctor drew up a map of Mars. It was based, somewhat crudely, on the Rev. William Rutter Dawes's earlier drawings of 1865, then the best ones available. Proctor explained his system of nomenclature by saying, "I have applied to the different features the names of those observers who have studied the physical peculiarities presented by Mars." Here are some of his names, paired with those later used by Schiaparelli in his Martian map created between 1877 and 1886. Schiaparelli's names were generally adopted and are the names actually used today:

| Proctor nomenclature | Schiaparelli nomenclature |
|---|---|
| Kaiser Sea | Syrtis Major |
| Lockyer Land | Hellas Planitia |
| Main Sea | Lacus Moeris |
| Herschel II Strait | Sinus Sabaeus |
| Dawes Continent | Aeria and Arabia |
| De La Rue Ocean | Mare Erythraeum |
| Lockyer Sea | Solis Lacus |
| Dawes Sea | Tithonius Lacus |
| Madler Continent | Chryse Planitia, Ophir, Tharsis |
| Maraldi Sea | Maria Sirenum and Cimmerium |
| Secchi Continent | Memnonia |
| Hooke Sea | Mare Tyrrhenum |
| Cassini Land | Ausonia |
| Herschel I Continent | Zephyria, Aeolis, Aethiopis |
| Hind Land | Libya |

Proctor's nomenclature has often been criticized, mainly because so many of his names honored English astronomers, but also because he used many names more than once. In particular, Dawes appeared no fewer than six times (Dawes Ocean, Dawes Continent, Dawes Sea, Dawes Strait, Dawes Isle, and Dawes Forked Bay). Even so, Proctor's names are not without charm, and for all their shortcomings they were a foundation on which later astronomers would improve.

=== Modern nomenclature ===
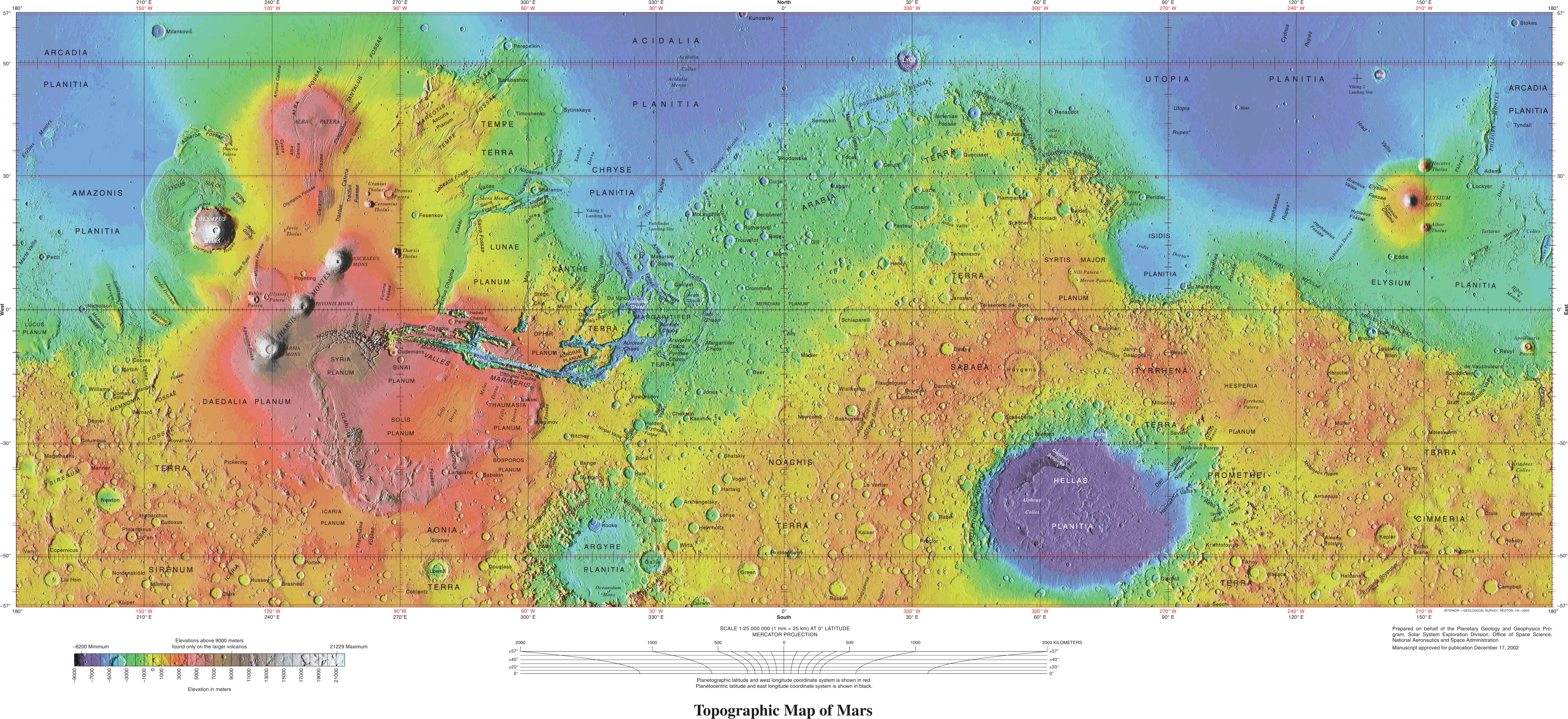
Planet Mars - Topographical Map, USGS, 2005

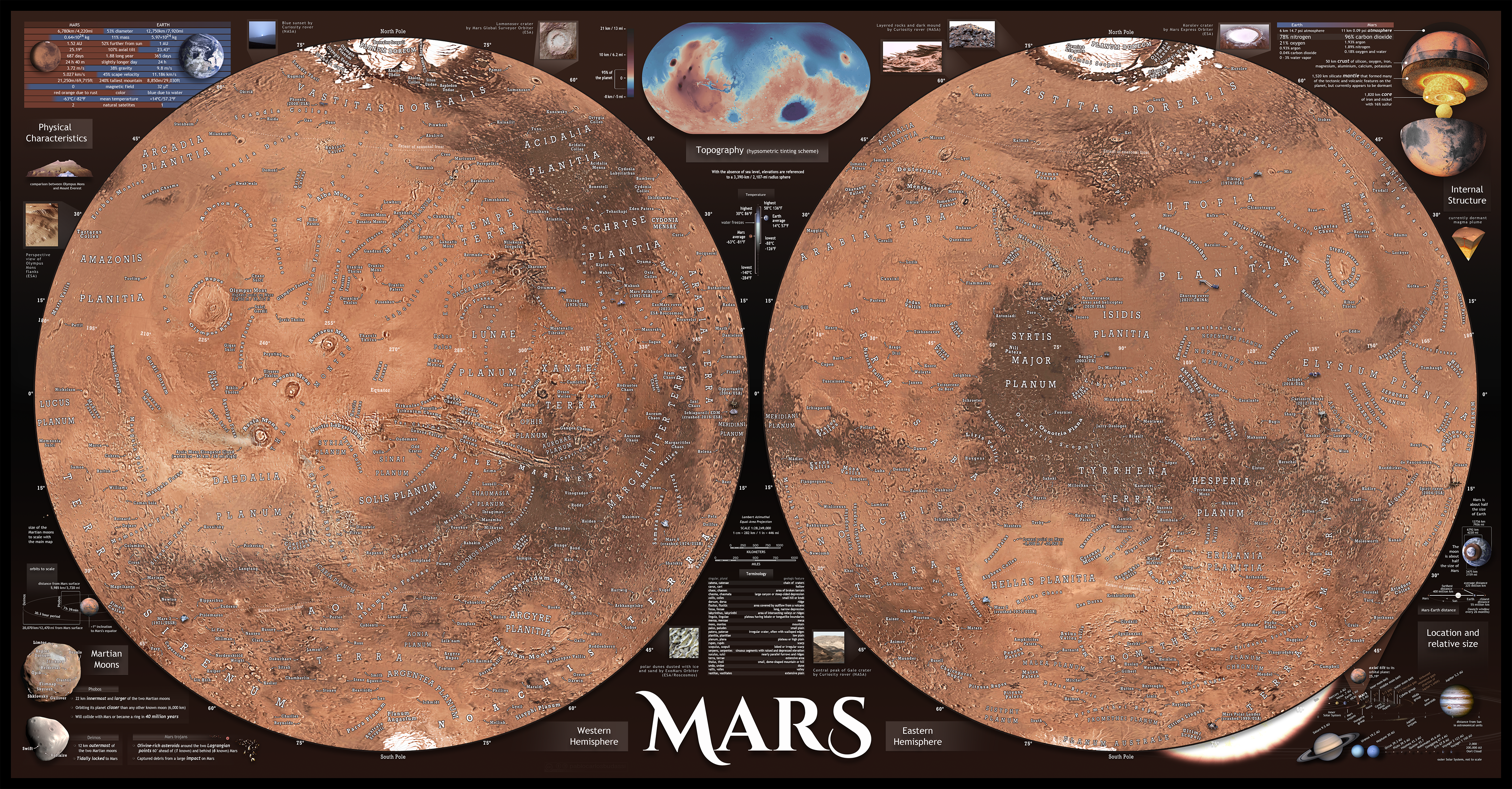
Informal names near Curiosity's landing site in contrast with official Herschel crater

Today, names of Martian features derive from a number of sources, but the names of the large features are derived primarily from the maps of Mars made in 1886 by the Italian astronomer Giovanni Schiaparelli. Schiaparelli named the larger features of Mars primarily using names from Greek mythology and to a lesser extent the Bible. Mars's large albedo features retain many of the older names, but are often updated to reflect new knowledge of the nature of the features. For example, 'Nix Olympica' (the snows of Olympus) has become Olympus Mons (Mount Olympus).

Large Martian craters are named after important scientists and science fiction writers; smaller ones are named after towns and villages on Earth.

Various landforms studied by the Mars Exploration Rovers are given temporary names or nicknames to identify them during exploration and investigation. However, it is hoped that the International Astronomical Union will make permanent the names of certain major features, such as the Columbia Hills, which were named after the seven astronauts who died in the Space Shuttle Columbia disaster.

== See also ==
- Chloride-bearing deposits on Mars
- Composition of Mars – Branch of the geology of Mars
- Geology of Mars – Geology of fourth planet from the Sun
- Glaciers on Mars – Extraterrestrial bodies of ice
- Gravity of Mars – Gravitational force exerted by the planet Mars
- Groundwater on Mars – Water held in permeable ground
- Gullies on Mars – Incised networks of narrow channels and sediments on Mars
- Lakes on Mars – Former bodies of water on Mars
- Life on Mars – Assessments of possible life on Mars
- Magnetic field of Mars – Past magnetic field of the planet Mars
- Martian regolith – Fine regolith found on the surface of Mars
- Ore resources on Mars – Ore deposits on Mars that may be useful to future colonists
- Selenography – Study of the surface and shape of the Moon
- Terraforming of Mars – Hypothetical modification of Mars into an Earth-like habitable planet
- Water on Mars – Study of past and present water on Mars
- Carbonates on Mars
- Colonization of Mars
- Mineralogy of Mars
