= Libya (disambiguation) =

Libya is a country in North Africa.

Libya may also refer to:

- Ancient Libya, a general term often used to refer to Africa in ancient times
- Italian Libya, the name of Libyan state under Italian rule
- Kingdom of Libya, the name of a Libyan state which existed between 1951 and 1969
- History of Libya under Muammar Gaddafi, the history of the state of Libya under the extended dictatorship of Muammar Gaddafi, from 1969 until his ousting, in 2011
- Libya (mythology), multiple figures in Greek mythology, including:
  - Libya (daughter of Epaphus), a princess after whom the country was supposedly named
- Libya Montes, a highland terrain on planet Mars
- MV Libya, a Greek coaster originating as Empire Spinney

== See also ==
- Lybia, a genus of crabs
- List of minor biblical tribes#Lehabim, a Biblical figure
- Libyan (disambiguation)
