= Mare Erythraeum =

Region of Mars

Mare Erythraeum /ɛrɪˈθriːəm/ is a very large dark dusky region of Mars that can be viewed by even a small telescope. Its name comes from the Latin for the Erythraean Sea because it was originally thought to be a large sea of liquid water. It was included in Percival Lowell's 1895 map of Mars.

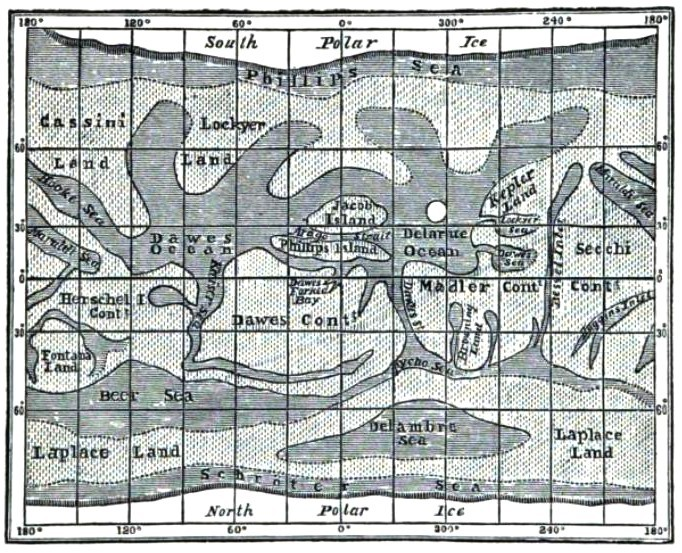
Richard A. Proctor's map of Mars, which named albedo features after astronomers. North is at the bottom as seen through an inverting telescope.

Under the name of De La Rue Ocean it was included in Procter's 1905 map of Mars.

== See also ==
- Geography of Mars
