= Joseph Edward Evans =

British schoolmaster and amateur astronomer (1855–1938)

Joseph Edward Evans (18 September 1855 – 25 December 1938) was a British schoolmaster and amateur astronomer, headmaster of the Royal Hospital School in Greenwich and a Fellow of the Royal Astronomical Society.

== Early and personal life ==
Joseph Edward Evans was born in Great Coggeshall, Essex, the eldest son of Lieutenant Charles Evans who was Chief Officer of the Coastguard at Robin Hood Bay. He entered the Royal Hospital School at Greenwich in 1866 aged eleven, took a Bachelor's Degree at London University and became a teacher.
He taught in Dindigul, Madras Province, in India where his three sons and eldest daughter were born. He returned to the UK in 1890, taking on various teaching posts before becoming headmaster at the Royal Hospital School in 1899 – a position he held until his retirement in 1920.

== Astronomical contributions ==
Evans combined his duties as Headmaster at the Royal Hospital School with work at the Royal Observatory in Greenwich. He collaborated with Edward Walter Maunder, a professional astronomer, with research into the question of whether there were canals on Mars – a topic of debate at the time. He used his position at the school to arrange an experiment in which boys were asked to reproduce drawings of various disc images, including ones on which no canals had been drawn but which contained "minute dot-like markings". Maunder and Evans found that when the disc was viewed from certain distances the boys visualised, and drew, "canals".
