= Face on Moon South Pole =

Region on the Moon which resembles a face

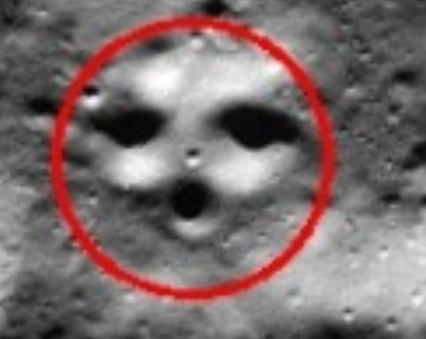
"The Face" near the Moon's South Pole

The Face on Moon South Pole is a region on the Moon (81.9° south latitude and 39.27° east longitude) that was detected automatically in an image from the Lunar Reconnaissance Orbiter by a computer system using face recognition technologies, as a result of a project that was part of the International Space App Challenge 2013 Tokyo. It is composed of craters and shadows on the Moon's surface that, together, form an image resembling a face.

== Face detection and recognition ==
Human brains have the ability to perceive faces on the Moon due to the brain's structure. On the left hemisphere of the human brain, the fusiform gyrus (an area linked to recognition) detects the accuracy of how "facelike" an object is. The right fusiform gyrus then uses information from the left fusiform gyrus to conclude whether or not the image is a face. The gyrus's inherent ability to detect faces and patterns in organisms and nature has also led to a phenomenon called pareidolia, in which the brain detects and recognizes faces and patterns in collections of objects where there should be none.

Pareidolia partially explains why humans are biased towards perceiving faces on inanimate objects such as the Moon.

Humans identify faces where there are none due to a Gestalt Principle called the Law of Prägnanz. The Law of Prägnanz states that "people will perceive and interpret ambiguous or complex images as the simplest form(s) possible." This means that because the craters and hills of the Moon resemble the shape of eyes and a mouth, the human brain condenses those images into a human face because of familiarity, which is another Gestalt Principle.

== Craters on the Moon ==
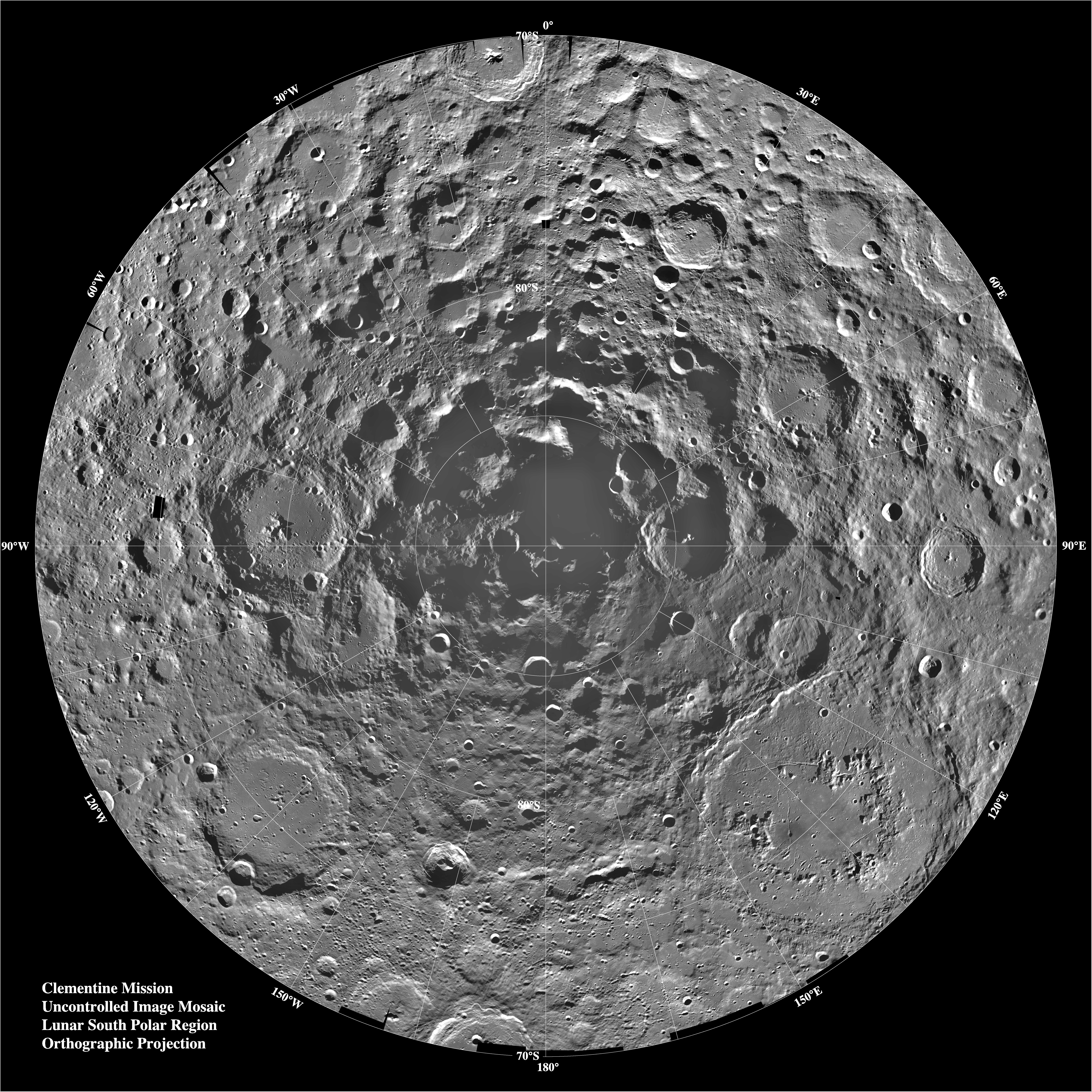
Lunar south pole as imaged by Clementine

The craters of the Moon that make up the "face" on the south pole have been preserved for billions of years. The Moon's exterior is 16% composed of these craters. These craters have been formed by the impacts of meteors; they can be up to 1,600 miles across. Due to the absence of an atmosphere, the Moon is not protected from impacts such as these. Craters are often covered with a mixture of fine dust and rocky debris called regolith. Some research conducted through Clementine suggests that there is also water and ice in some craters throughout the Moon. The craters themselves show a past of being filled with molten lava.

=== Perception of imagery on the Moon ===
Within Western culture, people have said to have seen "the man in the Moon". Within East Asian culture, people have seen a rabbit or hands. In addition, various people have seen different imagery such as a tree, a woman, or a toad.

When people describe the images they see on the Moon, such as a face, they are not directly seeing that image displayed upon the Moon. They are rather looking at an irregular section of the Moon's surface. The irregular section consists of deep holes, called craters, and hills.

== Other extraterrestrial formations ==
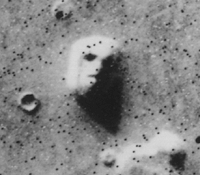
A satellite photo of a mesa in Cydonia, often called the Face on Mars. Later imagery from other angles did not include the shadows.

The face on the Moon is not the sole formation which appears to form an image on another astronomical object; another example is the "Face on Mars", discovered during the Viking 1 mission in 1976. While the face on the Moon is more inverted, the face on Mars is a three-dimensional mound resembling a human face. The "face" is located in a region called Cydonia.

There are also multiple other formations on Mars. There is a specific cluster of mountainous terrain that looks like a smiley face and a skull-like tableland. There is also a volcano that sports a lava flow indentation that strongly resembles Kermit the Frog from the Muppets.

Formations resembling the Cookie Monster have been seen in parts of Mercury, and images resembling an eye in the Helix Nebula. On Mercury, there is a clear collection of craters that some say forms an image of Mickey Mouse.

== See also ==
- Colonization of the Moon's polar regions
- Selenography
