= Cydonia (Mars) =

Area of Mars

Coordinates: 40.74°N 9.46°W

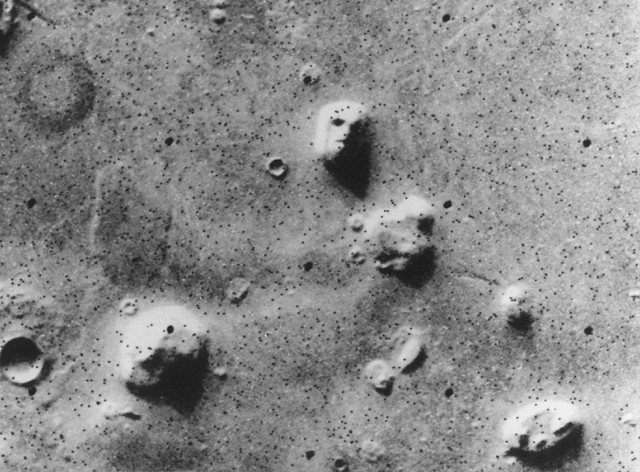
Small part of the Cydonia region, taken by the Viking 1 orbiter and released by NASA/JPL on July 25, 1976.

Cydonia (/sɪˈdoʊniə/, /saɪˈdoʊniə/) is a region on the planet Mars that has attracted both scientific and popular interest. The name originally referred to the albedo feature (distinctively coloured area) that was visible from earthbound telescopes. The area borders the plains of Acidalia Planitia and the highlands of Arabia Terra. The region includes the named features Cydonia Mensae, an area of flat-topped mesa-like features; Cydonia Colles, a region of small hills or knobs; and Cydonia Labyrinthus, a complex of intersecting valleys. As with other albedo features on Mars, the name Cydonia was drawn from classical antiquity, in this case from Kydonia (Ancient Greek: Κυδωνία; Latin: Cydonia), a historic polis (city-state) on the island of Crete. Cydonia contains the so-called Face on Mars, located about halfway between the craters Arandas and Bamberg.

== Location ==
Cydonia lies in the planet's northern hemisphere in a transitional zone between the heavily cratered regions to the south and relatively smooth plains to the north. Some planetologists believe that the northern plains may once have been ocean beds, and that Cydonia may once have been a coastal zone. It is in the Mare Acidalium quadrangle.

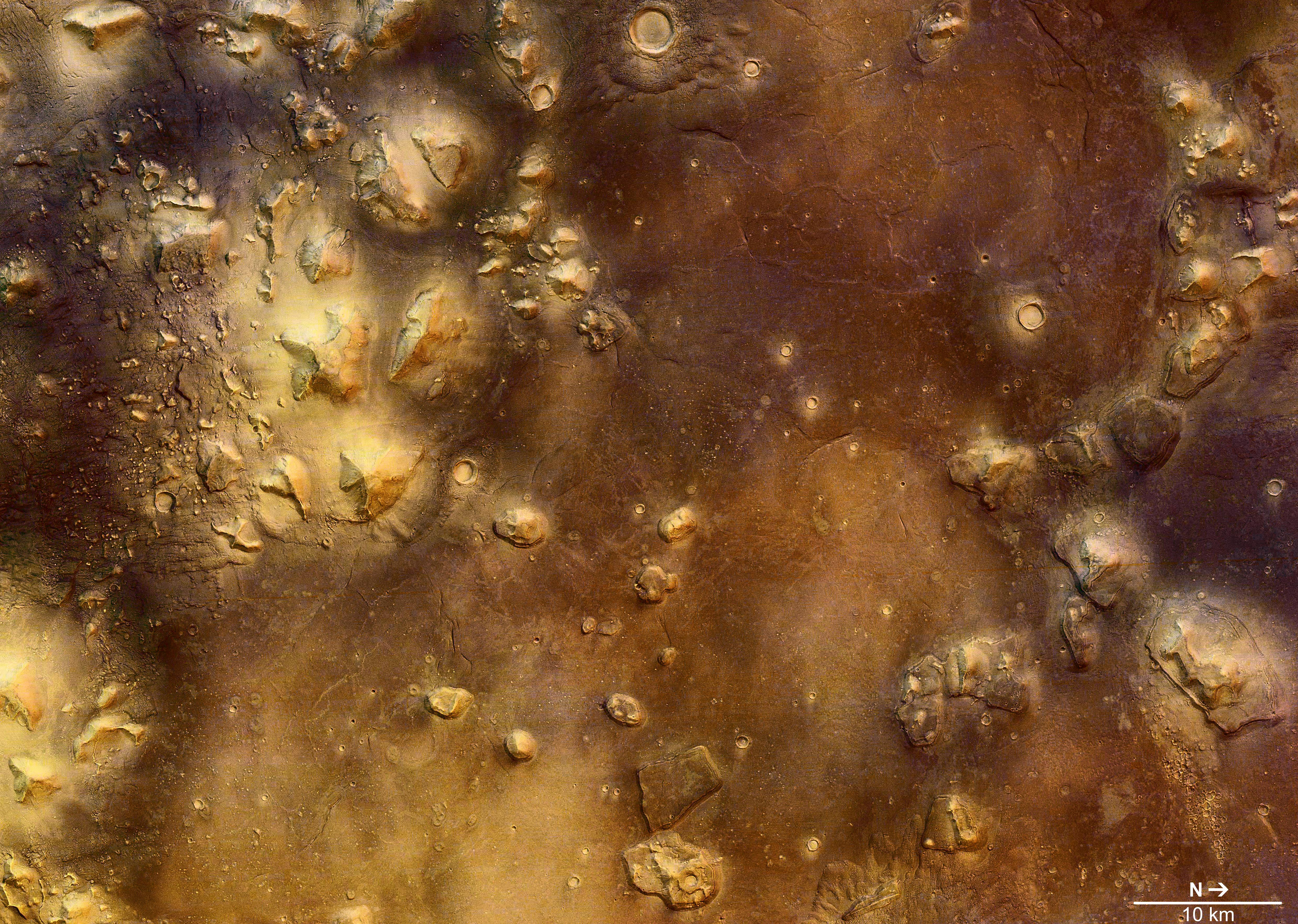
Picture of the Cydonia region taken in 2006 by The European Space Agency's satellite Mars Express. The Face on Mars is just below the center.

== Face on Mars ==
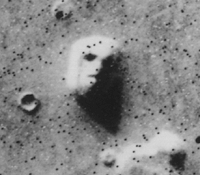
Cropped version of the original batch-processed image (#035A72) of the Face on Mars. The black dots that give the image a speckled appearance are data errors (salt-and-pepper noise).

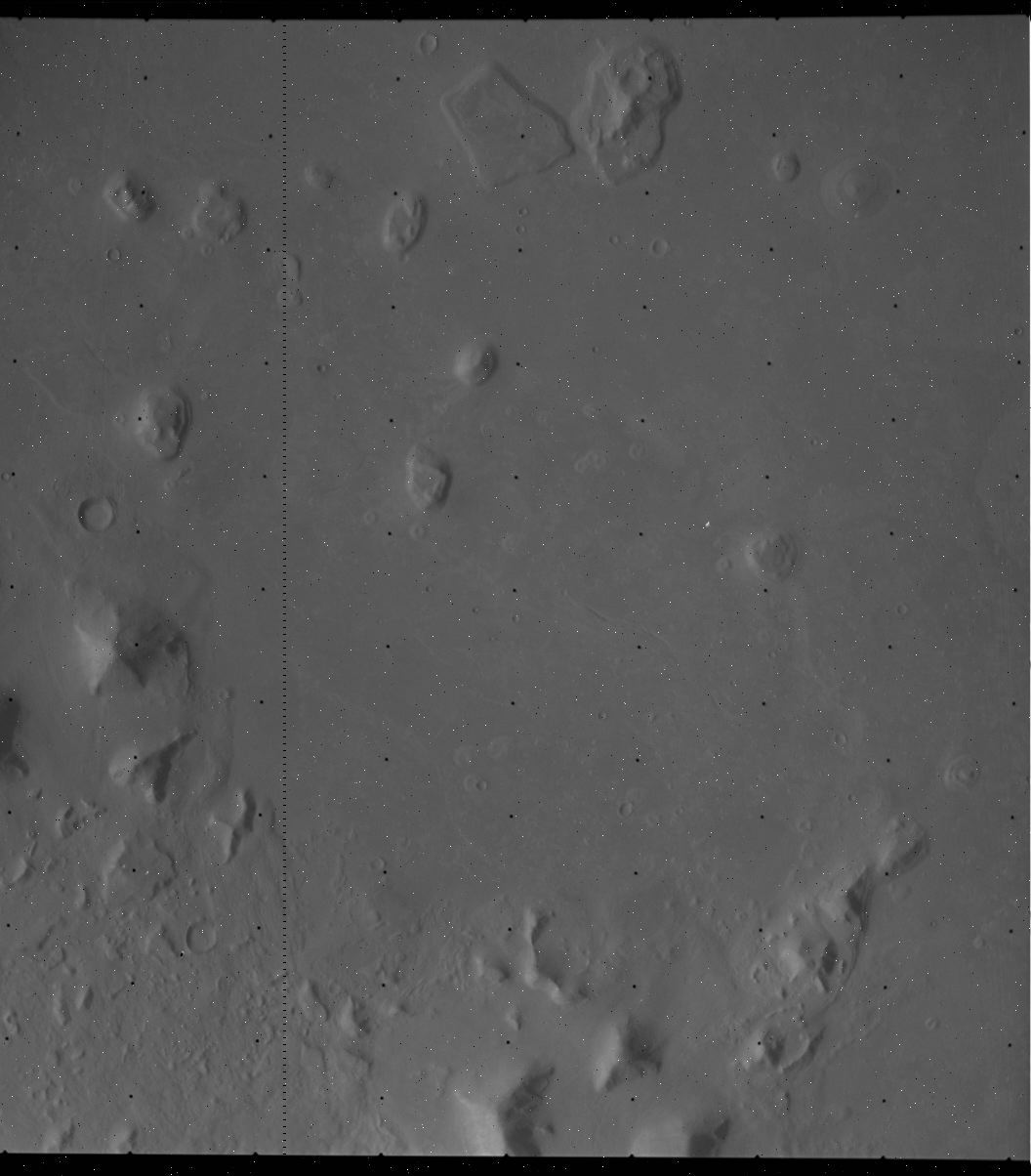
Second Viking 1 image (070A13) of the Cydonia region on Mars. The Face can be seen in the top left.

Cydonia was first imaged in detail by the Viking 1 and Viking 2 orbiters. Eighteen images of the Cydonia region were taken by the orbiters, of which seven have resolutions better than 250 m/pixel (820 ft/pixel). The other eleven images have resolutions that are worse than 550 m/pixel (1800 ft/pixel) and are of limited use for studying surface features. Of the seven good images, the lighting and time at which two pairs of images were taken are so close as to reduce the number to five distinct images. The Mission to Mars: Viking Orbiter Images of Mars CD-ROM set image numbers for these are: 035A72 (VO-1010), 070A13 (VO-1011), 561A25 (VO-1021), 673B54 & 673B56 (VO-1063), and 753A33 & 753A34 (VO-1028).

In one of the images taken by Viking 1 on July 25, 1976, a two-kilometre-long (1.2 mi) Cydonian mesa, situated at 40.75° north latitude and 9.46° west longitude, had the appearance of a humanoid face. When the image was originally acquired, Viking chief scientist Gerald Soffen dismissed the Face on Mars in image 035A72 as a "trick of light and shadow". A second image, 070A13, also shows the Face, and was acquired 35 Viking orbits later at a different sun angle from the 035A72 image. This latter discovery was made independently by Vincent DiPietro and Gregory Molenaar, two computer engineers at NASA's Goddard Space Flight Center. DiPietro and Molenaar discovered the two misfiled images, Viking frames 035A72 and 070A13, while searching through NASA archives. The resolution of these images was of about 50 m/pixel.

=== Later imagery ===
More than 20 years after the Viking 1 images were taken, a succession of spacecraft visited Mars and made new observations of the Cydonia region. These spacecraft have included NASA's Mars Global Surveyor (1997–2006) and Mars Reconnaissance Orbiter (2006–present), and the European Space Agency's Mars Express probe (2003–present). In contrast to the relatively low resolution of the Viking images of Cydonia, these new platforms afford much improved resolution. For instance, the Mars Express images are at a resolution of 14 m/pixel (46 ft/pixel) or better. By combining data from the High Resolution Stereo Camera (HRSC) on the Mars Express probe and the Mars Orbiter Camera (MOC) on board NASA's Mars Global Surveyor, it has been possible to create a three-dimensional representation of the Face on Mars.

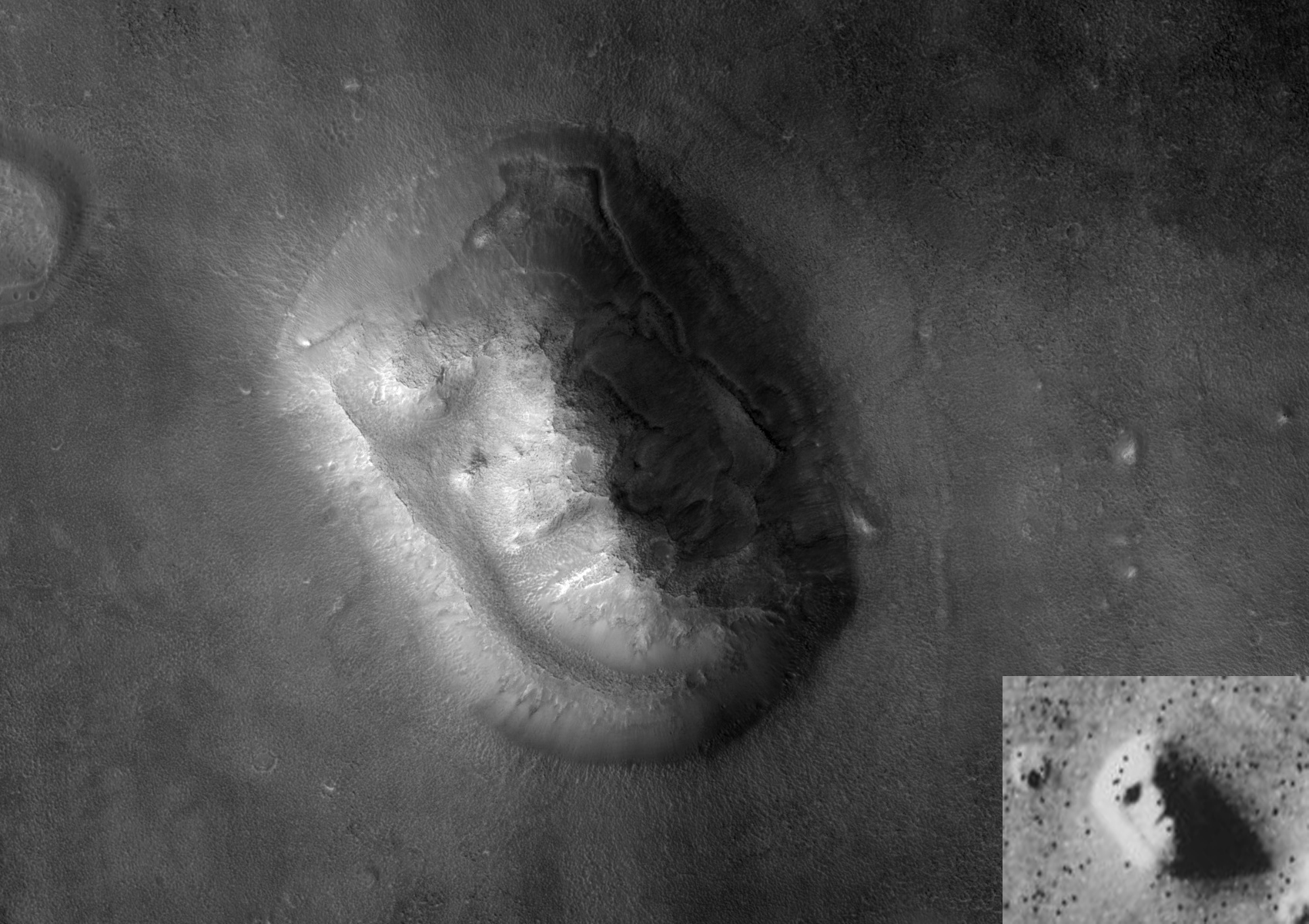
Mars Reconnaissance Orbiter image by its HiRISE camera of the Face on Mars (April, 2007). Viking Orbiter image inset in bottom right corner (July 1976).

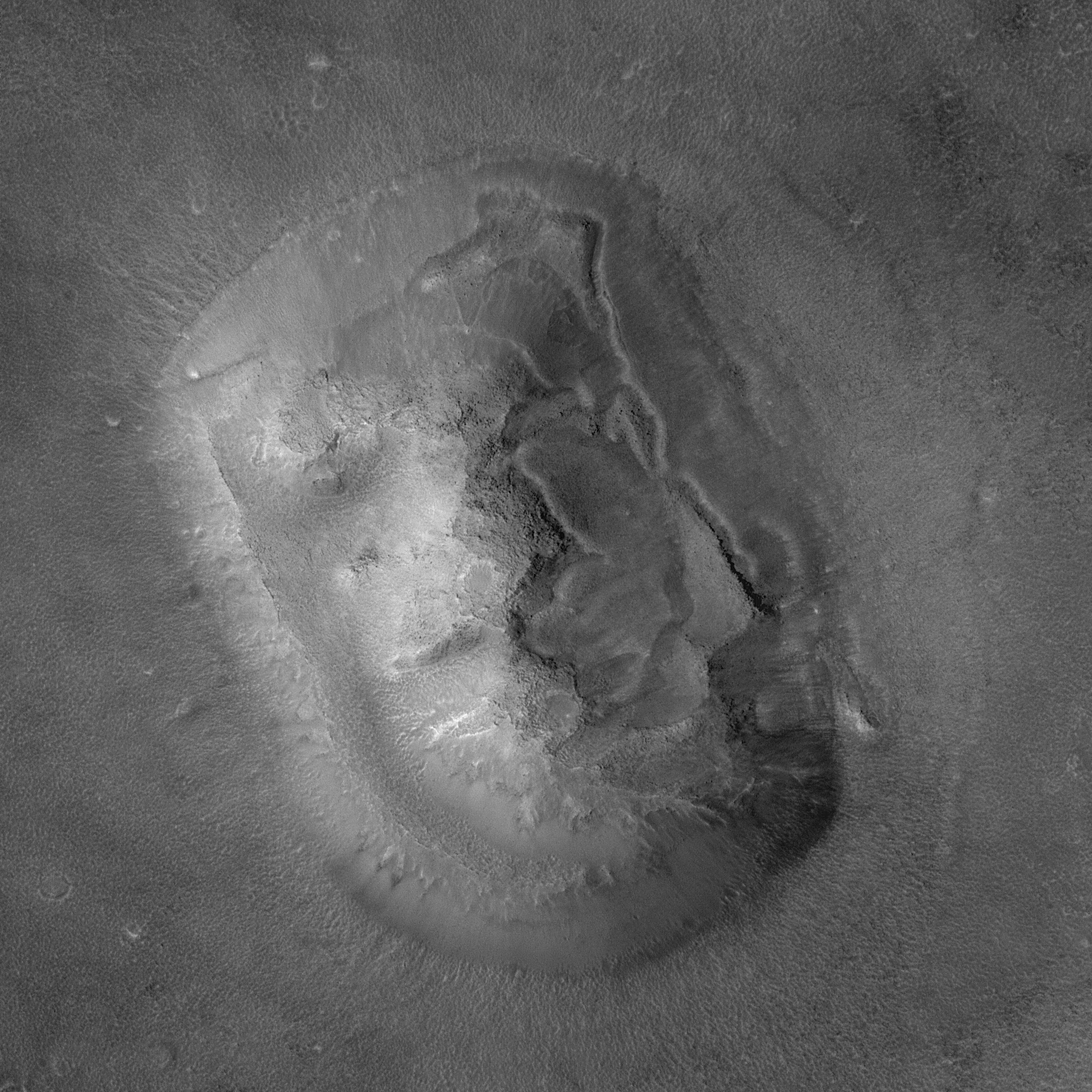
Mars Global Surveyor image (MOC camera) of the same feature (April 2001).

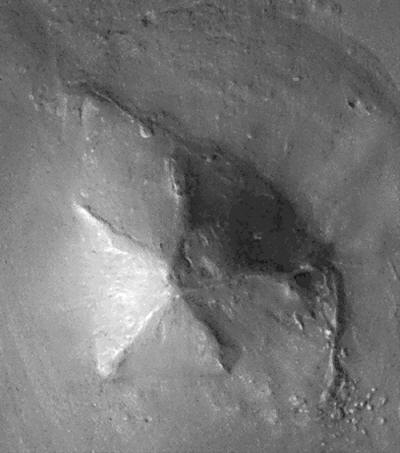
One of many formations in Cydonia; this one is sometimes called the "D & M pyramid". (1976)

Since it was first imaged, the face has been accepted by scientists as an optical illusion, an example of the psychological phenomenon of pareidolia. After analysis of the higher-resolution Mars Global Surveyor data NASA stated that "a detailed analysis of multiple images of this feature reveals a natural looking Martian hill whose illusory face-like appearance depends on the viewing angle and angle of illumination". Similar optical illusions can be found in the geology of Earth; examples include the Old Man of the Mountain, the Romanian Sphinx, Giewont, the Pedra da Gávea, the Old Man of Hoy, Stac Levenish, Sleeping Ute, and the Badlands Guardian.

=== Speculation ===
The Cydonia facial pareidolia inspired individuals and organizations interested in extraterrestrial intelligence and visitations to Earth, and the images were published in this context in 1977. Some commentators, most notably Richard C. Hoagland, believe the Face on Mars to be evidence of a long-lost Martian civilization along with other features they believe are present, such as apparent pyramids, which they argue are part of a ruined city.

While accepting the Face as a subject for scientific study, astronomer Carl Sagan criticized much of the speculation concerning it in the chapter "The Man in the Moon and the Face on Mars" in his 1995 book The Demon-Haunted World. The shape-from-shading work by Mark J. Carlotto was used by Sagan in a chapter of his famous Cosmos series. In 1998, a news article about the "Space Face" quoted a scientist talking about deciphering "intelligent design" in nature. A cutting of this was used by Charles Thaxton as an overhead visual for a lecture at Princeton, in his first public use of the term "intelligent design" as a substitute for creation science.

The Face is also a common topic among skeptic groups, who use it as an example of credulity.

== See also ==
- Apophenia – Tendency to perceive connections between unrelated things
- Face on Moon South Pole – Region on the Moon which resembles a face
- Geography of Mars – Delineation and characterization of Martian regions
- Libya Montes – Highland terrain on Mars up-lifted by a giant impact, home to another such face
- List of topics characterized as pseudoscience
- Man in the Moon – Pattern observed on the Moon's surface
- Mission to Mars, 2000 film in which the feature plays a role in the plot
- "Space", an X-Files episode inspired by the Face
