= Libyan (disambiguation) =

Libyan is a redirect to Demographics of Libya.

Libyan may also refer to:

- A person or thing of, from, or related to Libya in North Africa. See list of Libyans
- something of or related to Ancient Libya
- Libyan Arabic, a variety of the Arabic language (see also Languages of Libya)
- Libyan cuisine

== See also ==
- Libian, in the history of Chinese writing
- Libya (disambiguation)
