= Martian canals =

Erroneous idea of canals on Mars

A 1962 map of Mars published by the U.S. Aeronautical Chart and Information Center, showing canals snaking through the Martian landscape. At the time, the existence of the canals was still highly controversial as no close-up pictures of Mars had been taken (until Mariner 4's flyby in 1965).

During the late 19th and early 20th centuries, it was erroneously believed that there were "canals" on the planet Mars. These were a network of long straight lines on Mars, observed by astronomers using early telescopes without photography, that were believed to be engineering works or waterways via the mistranslation of Schiaparelli’s term canali ("channels") into English as “canals.” Modern historians of science widely agree that the Martian canals were a perceptual and linguistic artifact, arising from telescope limitations combined with optical illusions.

They were first described by the Italian astronomer Giovanni Schiaparelli during the opposition of 1877, and attested to by later observers. The Irish astronomer Charles E. Burton made some of the earliest drawings of straight-line features on Mars, although his drawings did not match Schiaparelli's. Around the turn of the century there was even speculation that they were engineering works, irrigation canals constructed by a civilization of intelligent aliens indigenous to Mars.

By the early 20th century, improved astronomical observations revealed that, with the possible exception of the natural canyon Valles Marineris, the "canals" were likely optical illusions, and modern high-resolution mapping of the Martian surface by spacecraft supports this interpretation.

Although the existence of Martian canals was eventually disproven by improved astronomical observations, Schiaparelli's reports of linear features on Mars had a profound and lasting influence on science fiction. His observations, together with the popular interpretation that these features were artificial waterways, inspired writers to imagine Mars as a world inhabited by intelligent beings and advanced civilizations. This vision was further developed and popularized by Percival Lowell, whose theories of a dying Martian civilization sustaining itself through vast irrigation canals captured the public imagination. As a result, the concept of canal-covered Mars became one of the defining images of the planet in literature, shaping works by authors such as H. G. Wells, Edgar Rice Burroughs, C. S. Lewis, and Robert A. Heinlein.

== Supposed "discoveries" ==
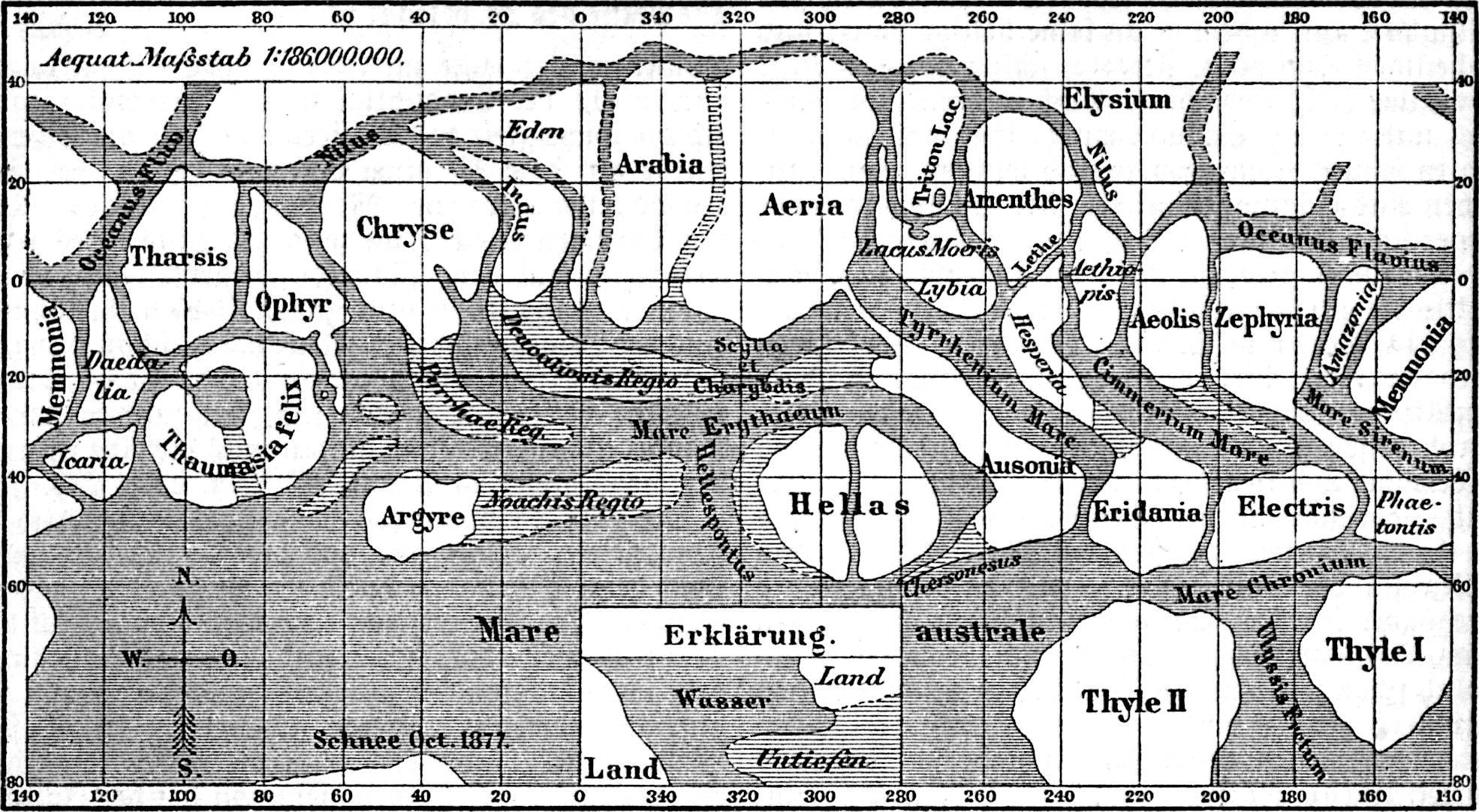
1877 map of Mars by Giovanni Schiaparelli with names and islands lifted from Earth's geography.

The Italian word canale (plural canali) can mean "canal", "channel", "duct" or "gully". The first person to use the word canale in connection with Mars was Angelo Secchi in 1858, although he did not see any straight lines and applied the term to large features—for example, he used the name "Canale Atlantico" for what later came to be called Syrtis Major Planum.

On 5 September 1877, a perihelic opposition to Mars occurred. The Italian astronomer Giovanni Schiaparelli used a 22-centimetre (8.7 in) telescope in Milan to help produce the first detailed map of Mars. These maps notably contained features he called canali, which, with the possible exception of the natural canyon Valles Marineris, were later shown to be an optical illusion. These canali were supposedly long, straight lines on the surface of Mars, after both real and legendary rivers of various places on Earth, or the mythological underworld. He estimated that these canali were 75 kilometres (47 mi) in width, the smallest 75 kilometres (47 mi) in length and the widest was 3,000 kilometres (1,900 mi). His term, which means "channels" or "grooves", was popularly mistranslated in English as "canals".

Influenced by the observations, the orientalist Percival Lowell founded an observatory which had 30- and 45-centimetre (12- and 18-in) telescopes. The observatory was used for the exploration of Mars during the last good opportunity in 1894, and the following less favorable oppositions. He published several books on Mars and life on the planet, which had a great influence on the public. The canali were independently observed by other astronomers, such as Henri Joseph Perrotin and Louis Thollon in Nice, using one of the largest telescopes of that time.

The seasonal changes (consisting of the diminishing of the polar caps and the dark areas formed during Martian summers) in combination with the canals led to speculation about life on Mars, and it was a long-held belief that Mars contained vast seas and vegetation. As bigger telescopes were used, fewer long, straight canali were observed.

At this time in the late 19th century, the resolution of telescopes reached a level sufficient for surface features to be identified. Astronomers had to stare for hours through their telescopes, waiting for a moment of still air when the image was clear, and then draw a picture of what they had seen. Astronomers believed at the time that Mars had a relatively substantial atmosphere. They knew that the rotation period of Mars (the length of its day) was almost the same as Earth's, and they knew that Mars's axial tilt was also almost the same as Earth's, which meant it had seasons in the astronomical and meteorological sense. They could also see Mars's polar ice caps shrinking and growing with these changing seasons. The similarities with Earth led them to interpret darker albedo features (for instance Syrtis Major) on the lighter surface as oceans. By the late 1920s, however, it was known that Mars is very dry and has a very low atmospheric pressure.

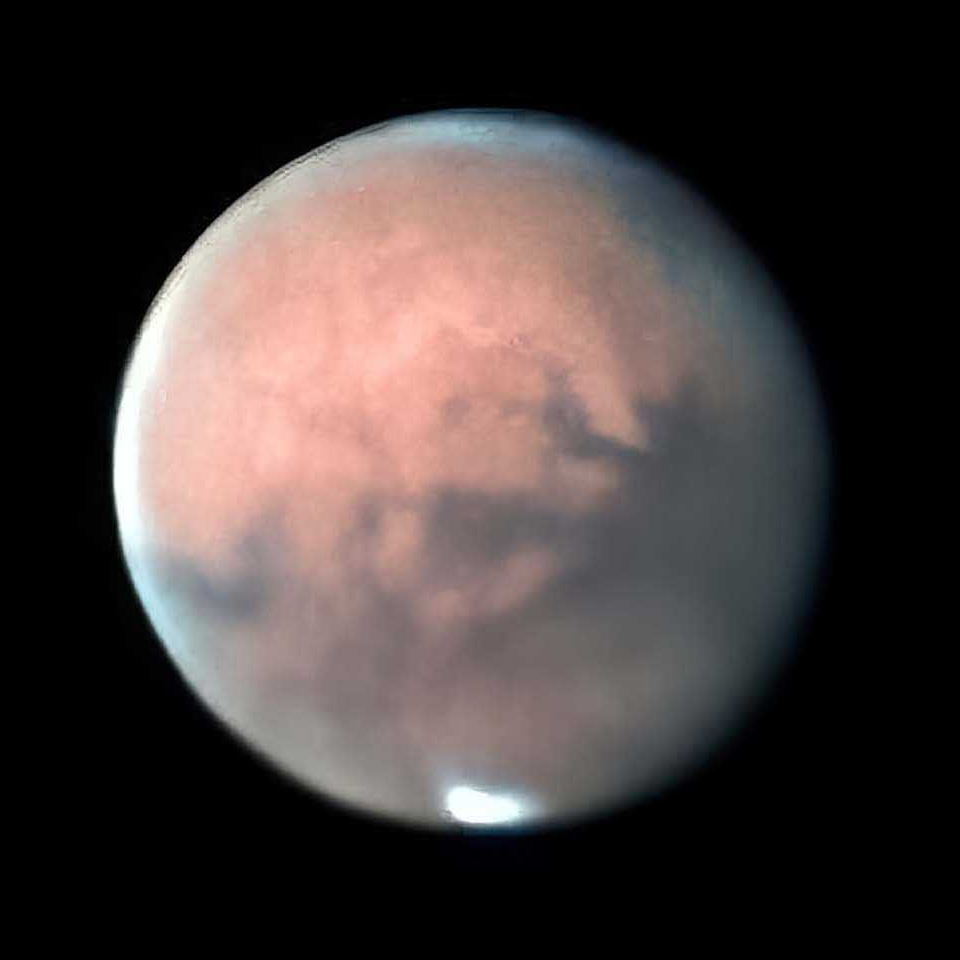
This is a modern ground-based telescope picture of Mars which uses lucky imaging to achieve a near perfect theoretical resolution. However, due to astronomical seeing, it is extremely difficult to see finer details.

In 1889, American astronomer Charles A. Young reported that Schiaparelli's canal discovery of 1877 had been confirmed in 1881, though new canals had appeared where there had not been any before, prompting "very important and perplexing" questions as to their origin.

During the favourable opposition of 1892, W. H. Pickering observed numerous small circular black spots occurring at every intersection or starting-point of the "canals". Many of these had been seen by Schiaparelli as larger dark patches, and were termed seas or lakes; but Pickering's observatory was at Arequipa, Peru, about 2,400 metres (7,900 ft) above the sea, and with such atmospheric conditions as were, in his opinion, equal to a doubling of telescopic aperture. They were soon detected by other observers.

During the oppositions of 1892 and 1894, seasonal color changes were reported. This was first interpreted as the melting of polar snows, leading to overflowing of adjacent seas which spread out as far as the tropics, assuming a distinctly green colour. However, in 1894, doubts arose as to whether there were any seas at all. Under the best conditions, these supposed 'seas' were seen to lose all trace of uniformity, their appearance being that of a mountainous terrain, broken by ridges, rifts, and canyons.

== Interpretation as engineering works ==
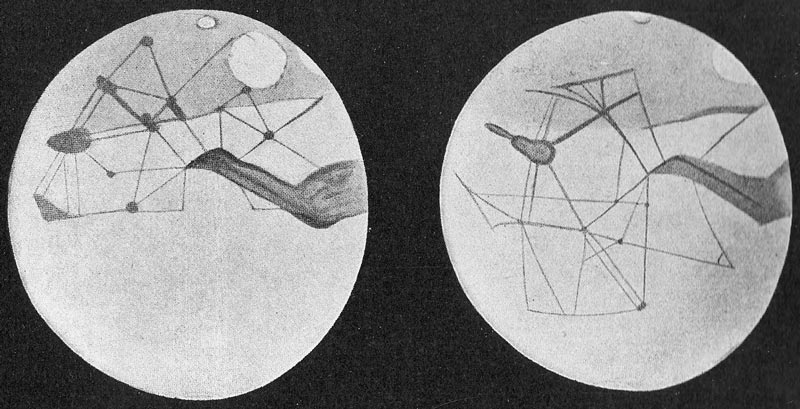
Martian canals depicted by Percival Lowell

The hypothesis that there was life on Mars originated from seasonal changes observed in surface features, which began to be interpreted as due to seasonal growth of plants (in fact, Martian dust storms are responsible for some of this).

During the 1894 opposition, the idea that Schiaparelli's canali were really irrigation canals made by intelligent beings was first hinted at, and then adopted as the only intelligible explanation, by American astronomer Percival Lowell and a few others. The visible seasonal melting of Mars polar icecaps fueled speculation that an advanced alien race indigenous to Mars built canals to transport the water to drier equatorial regions. Newspaper and magazine articles about Martian canals and "Martians" captured the public imagination. Lowell published his views in three books: Mars (1895), Mars and Its Canals (1906), and Mars As the Abode of Life (1908). He remained a strong proponent for the rest of his life of the idea that the canals were built for irrigation by an intelligent civilization, going much further than Schiaparelli, who for his part considered much of the detail on Lowell's drawings to be imaginary. Some observers drew maps in which dozens if not hundreds of canals were shown with an elaborate nomenclature for all of them. Lowell and Schiapelli saw a phenomenon they called "gemination", or doubling – two parallel canals.

== Contemporary doubts and definitive debunk ==
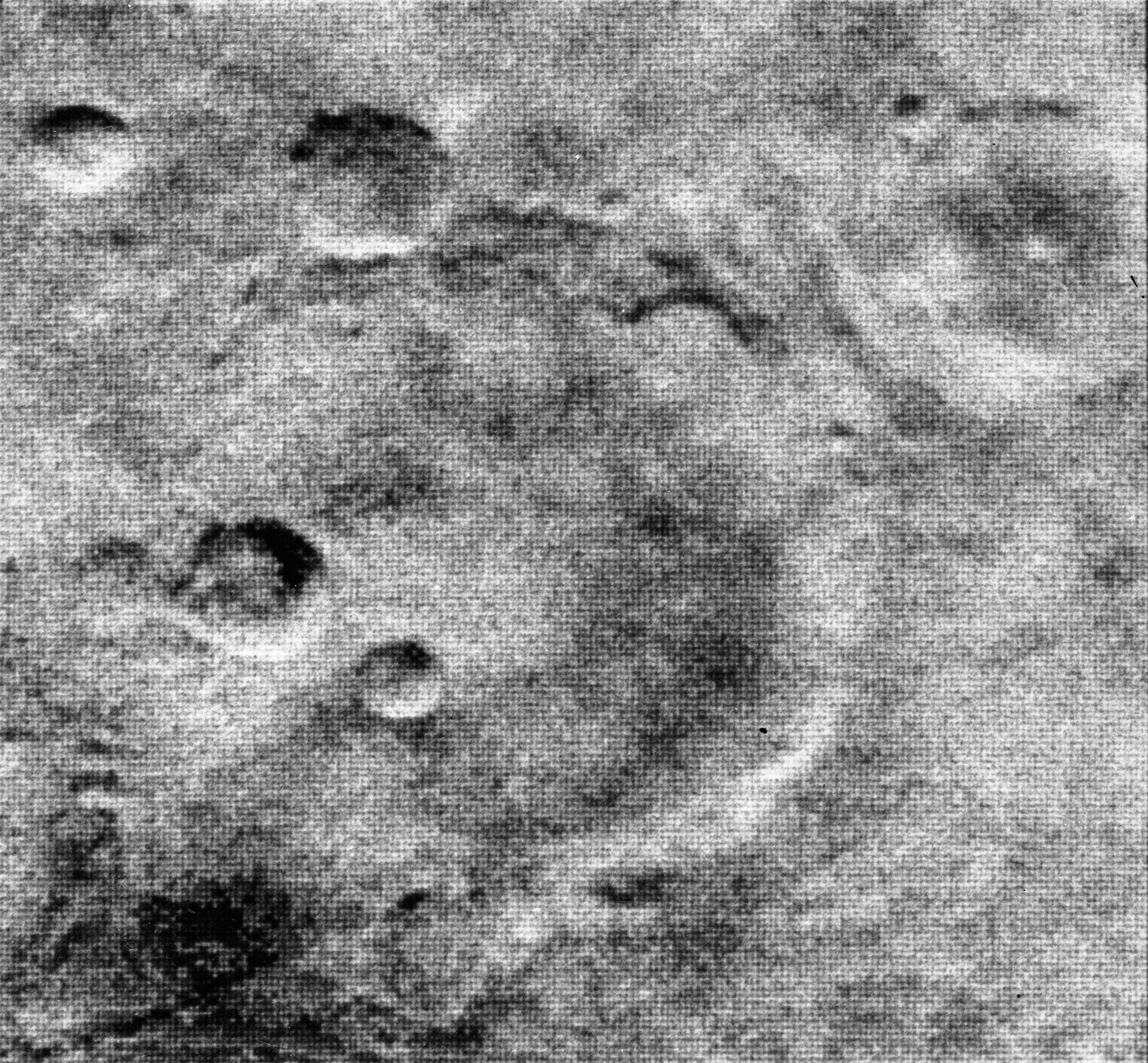
Mars surface imaged by the Mariner 4 probe in 1965, disproving the Martian canals idea

Other observers disputed the notion of canals. The influential observer Eugène Antoniadi used the 83 centimetres (33 in) aperture telescope at Meudon Observatory during the 1909 opposition of Mars and saw no canals. The outstanding photos of Mars taken at the new Baillaud dome at the Pic du Midi observatory also brought formal discredit to the Martian canals theory in 1909, and the notion of canals began to fall out of favor. Around this time spectroscopic analysis also began to show that no water was present in the Martian atmosphere. However, as of 1916 Waldemar Kaempffert (editor of Scientific American and later Popular Science Monthly) was still vigorously defending the Martian canals theory against skeptics.

In 1907 the British naturalist Alfred Russel Wallace published the book Is Mars Habitable? that severely criticized Lowell's claims. Wallace's analysis showed that the surface of Mars was almost certainly much colder than Lowell had estimated, and that the atmospheric pressure was too low for liquid water to exist on the surface. He also pointed out that several recent efforts to find evidence of water vapor in the Martian atmosphere with spectroscopic analysis had failed. He concluded that complex life was impossible, let alone the planet-girding irrigation system claimed by Lowell.

The existence of Martian canals was still controversial even at the dawn of the Space Race. In 1965, the Sourcebook on the space sciences said that "Although there is no unanimous opinion concerning the existence of the canals, most astronomers would probably agree that there are apparently linear (or approximately linear) markings, perhaps 40 to 160 kilometers (25 to 100 miles) or more across and of considerable length." Later in the same year, the arrival of the United States' Mariner 4 spacecraft debunked for good the idea that Mars could be inhabited by higher forms of life, or that any canal features existed. It took pictures revealing impact craters and a generally barren Martian landscape, with a surface atmospheric pressure of 4.1 to 7.0 millibars (410 to 700 pascals), 0.4% to 0.7% of Earth atmospheric pressure, and daytime temperatures of −100 degrees Celsius were measured. No magnetic field, nor radiation belts were detected.

As early as 1903, Joseph Edward Evans and Edward Maunder conducted visual experiments using schoolboy volunteers that demonstrated how the canals could arise as an optical illusion. This is because when a poor-quality telescope views many point-like features (e.g. sunspots or craters) they appear to join up to form lines. Based on his own experiments, Lowell's assistant, A. E. Douglass, was led to explain the observations in essentially psychological terms. In hindsight, William Kenneth Hartmann, a Mars imaging scientist from the 1960s to the 2000s, hypothesized that the "canals" were streaks of dust caused by wind on the leeward side of mountains and craters. Valles Marineris has been proposed to correspond to the Coprates canal.

== In popular culture ==
A clement twilight zone on a synchronously rotating Mercury, a swamp-and-jungle Venus, and a canal-infested Mars, while all classic science-fiction devices, are all, in fact, based upon earlier misapprehensions by planetary scientists.

— Carl Sagan, 1978

Schiaparelli's findings were generally interpreted—by those who accepted their disputed existence—as waterways, and they made their earliest appearance in fiction in the anonymously published 1883 novel Politics and Life in Mars, (Note: Some sources give the title as "Politics and Life on Mars". This would appear to be an error.) where the Martians live in the water. Schiaparelli's observations, and perhaps the translation of canali as "canals" rather than "channels", inspired many science-fiction stories. Percieval Lowell speculated that these were artificial constructs and write a series of non-fiction books—Mars in 1895, Mars and Its Canals in 1906, and Mars as the Abode of Life in 1908—popularizing the idea. Lowell posited that Mars was home to an ancient and advanced but dying or already dead Martian civilization who had constructed these vast canals for irrigation to survive on an increasingly arid planet, and this became an enduring vision of Mars that influenced writers across several decades. Science fiction scholar Gary Westfahl, drawing from the catalogue of early science fiction works compiled by E. F. Bleiler and Richard Bleiler in the reference works Science-Fiction: The Early Years from 1990 and Science-Fiction: The Gernsback Years from 1998, concludes that Lowell thus "effectively set the boundaries for subsequent narratives about an inhabited Mars".

In 1896, Wells published an essay on 'Intelligence on Mars' in the Saturday Review, setting out ideas about life on Mars. Wells speculates on the nature of Martian inhabitants and how their evolutionary progress might compare to humans. These ideas are used almost unchanged in The War of the Worlds. Canals became a feature of romantic portrayals of Mars such as Edgar Rice Burroughs's Barsoom series. Early works that did not depict any waterways on Mars typically explained the appearance of straight lines on the surface in some other way, such as simooms or large tracts of vegetation. Although they quickly fell out of favour as a serious scientific theory, largely as a result of higher-quality telescopic observations, canals continued to make sporadic appearances in fiction for a while in works such as the 1936 novel Planet Plane by John Wyndham, the 1938 novel Out of the Silent Planet by C. S. Lewis, and the 1949 novel Red Planet by Robert A. Heinlein. Said Lewis in response to criticism from biologist J. B. S. Haldane, "The canals in Mars are there not because I believe in them but because they are part of the popular tradition."

== See also ==
- List of Martian canals
- Classical albedo features on Mars – Early attempts at describing the surface of Mars
- Face on Mars – Area of Mars
- History of Mars observation
- Life on Mars – Assessments of possible life on Mars
- Lineae – Long markings on a planet or moon
- Outflow channel – Long, wide swathes of scoured ground on Mars
- Solis Lacus – Lacus on Mars
- Valley networks (Mars) – Branching networks of valleys on Mars
- Water on Mars – Study of past and present water on Mars
