= Aurorae Sinus =

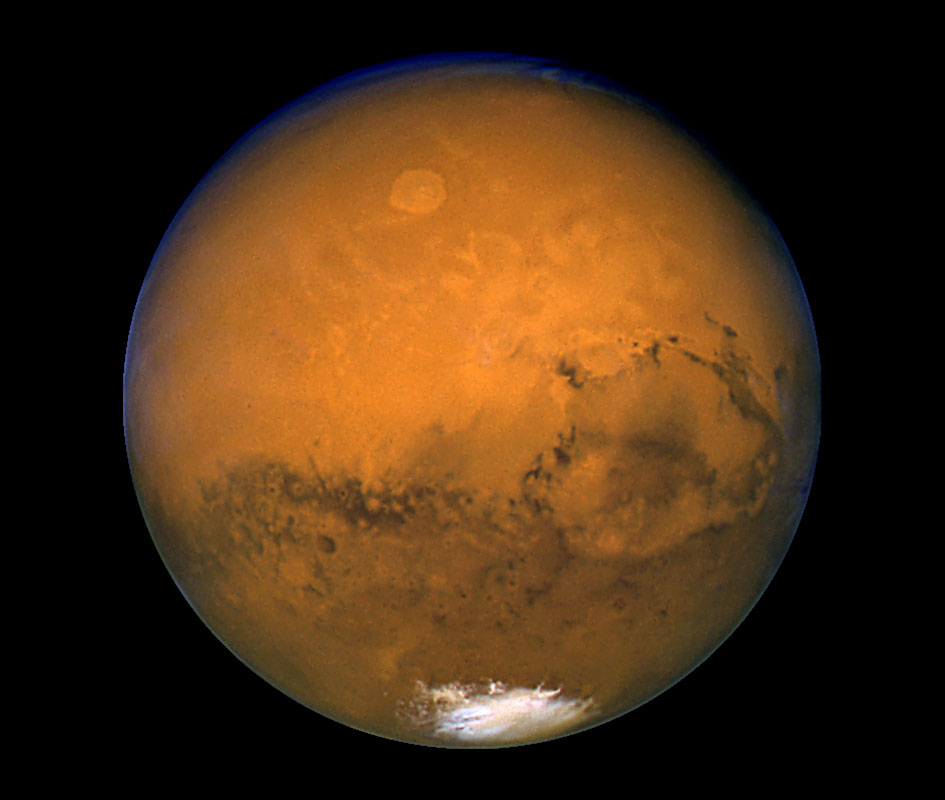
The "eye of Mars"

Aurorae Sinus is a dark feature in the southern hemisphere of the planet Mars. Together with albedo features contributed by Aonius Sinus and Solis Lacus, it is part of a feature known as the "eye of Mars". A albedo feature is an area which shows a contrast in brightness or darkness (albedo) with adjacent areas.
