= Erythraean Sea =

Ancient name of water between the Horn of Africa and the Arabian peninsula

Erythraean Sea Ἐρυθρὰ Θάλασσα
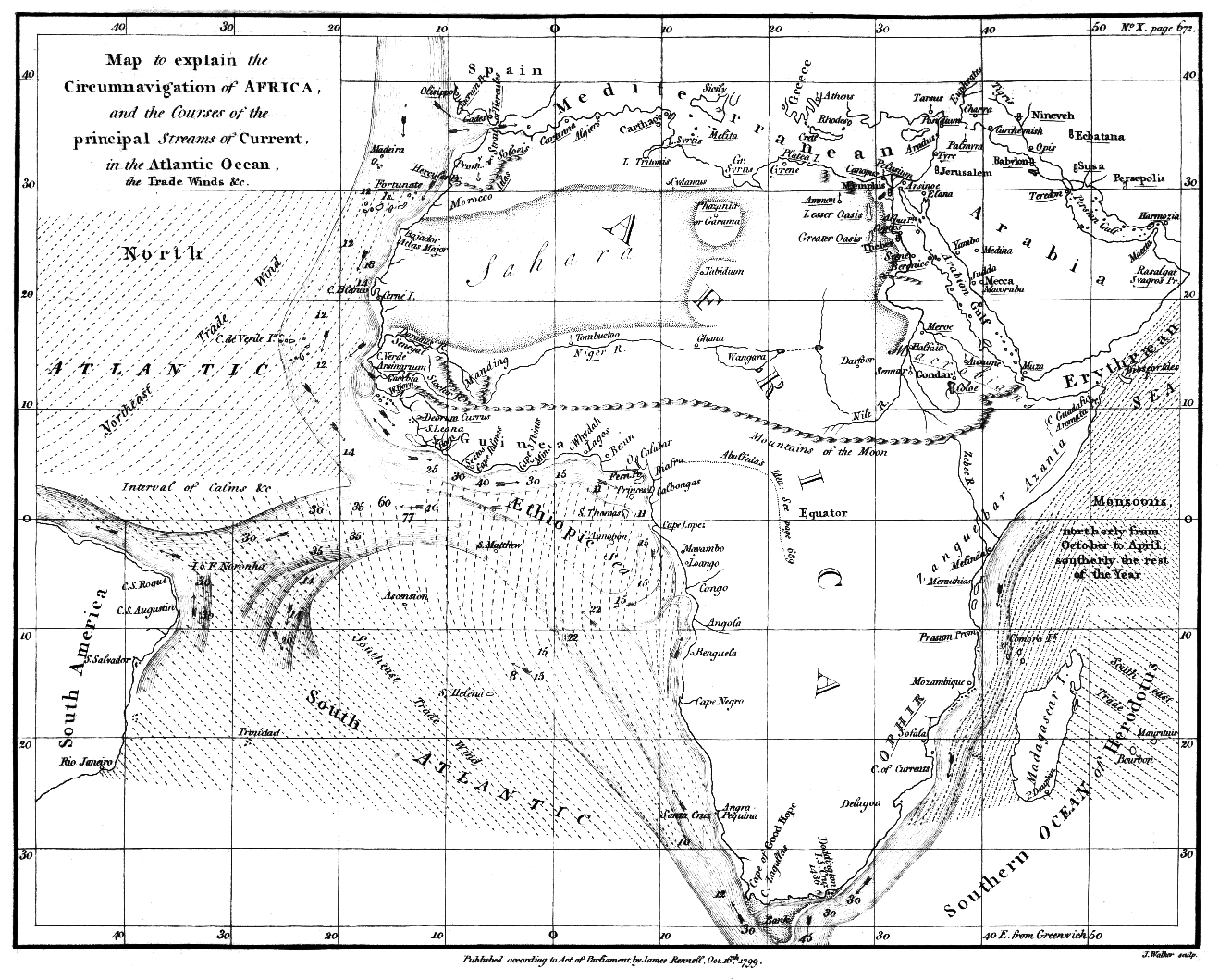
- An eighteenth century map showing the Erythraean Sea off the Horn of Africa. Drawn by James Rennell (1799)

- Location within Indian Ocean
- Location: Northwestern Indian Ocean
- Coordinates: 12°0′N 55°0′E
- Type: Sea
- Basin countries: Yemen, Somalia, Eritrea, Djibouti

The Erythraean Sea (Ancient Greek: Ἐρυθρὰ Θάλασσα, Erythrà Thálassa, lit. 'Red Sea') was a former maritime designation that always included the Gulf of Aden, and at times other seas between Arabia Felix and the Horn of Africa. Originally an ancient Greek geographical designation, the term was used throughout Europe until the 18th and 19th centuries. The area referred to by this name frequently extended beyond the Gulf of Aden—as in the famous 1st-century Periplus of the Erythraean Sea—to designate all of the present-day Red Sea, Arabian Sea, Persian Gulf, and Indian Ocean as a single maritime area.

== Name ==
The Greeks themselves derived the name from an eponymous King Erythras and knew that the waters so described were deep blue. Modern scholars sometimes attribute the name to the seasonal blooms of the red-hued Trichodesmium erythraeum in the Red Sea. Agatharchides had written of the origin of the name Erythraean Sea on the book (De Mari Erythraeo, § 5) in a story about the king Erythras: "There was a man famous for his valor and wealth, by name Erythras, a Persian by birth, son of Myozaeus.... the glory of the Island ascribed to him by the popular voice because of these his deeds, that even down to our own time they have called that sea, infinite in extent, Erythraean Sea".

== Use ==
The name "Erythraean Sea" has been or is still used for the following places:

- In the opening sentences of Herodotus' history, written in the 5th century BC, he refers to the Phoenicians having come originally from the Erythraean Sea.
- In the Periplus of the Erythraean Sea, written in the 1st century AD, as well as in some ancient maps, the name of the sea refers to the whole area of the northwestern Indian Ocean, including the Arabian Sea.
- In centuries past, the name "Erythraean Sea" was applied by cartographers to the north-western part of the Indian Ocean, mainly the area around Socotra, between Cape Guardafui and the coast of Hadhramaut. This appellation has now become obsolete and the name Gulf of Aden is used although for a smaller area. In maps in which the north-western part of the Indian Ocean is named thus, the Red Sea appears as "Arabian Gulf".
- The name "Erythraean Sea" was used as well to refer to some gulfs attached to the Indian Ocean, specifically, Gulf of Aden and Gulf of Oman.
- As a name for the Red Sea, especially after the 19th century, the Red Sea is also always called with the Ancient Greek name in Modern Greek. The modern country of Eritrea was named after the Ancient Greek name.
- Since 1895, the name has also been applied to a large dusky region on the surface of planet Mars that is known as Mare Erythraeum.

Names, routes and locations of the Periplus of the Erythraean Sea.

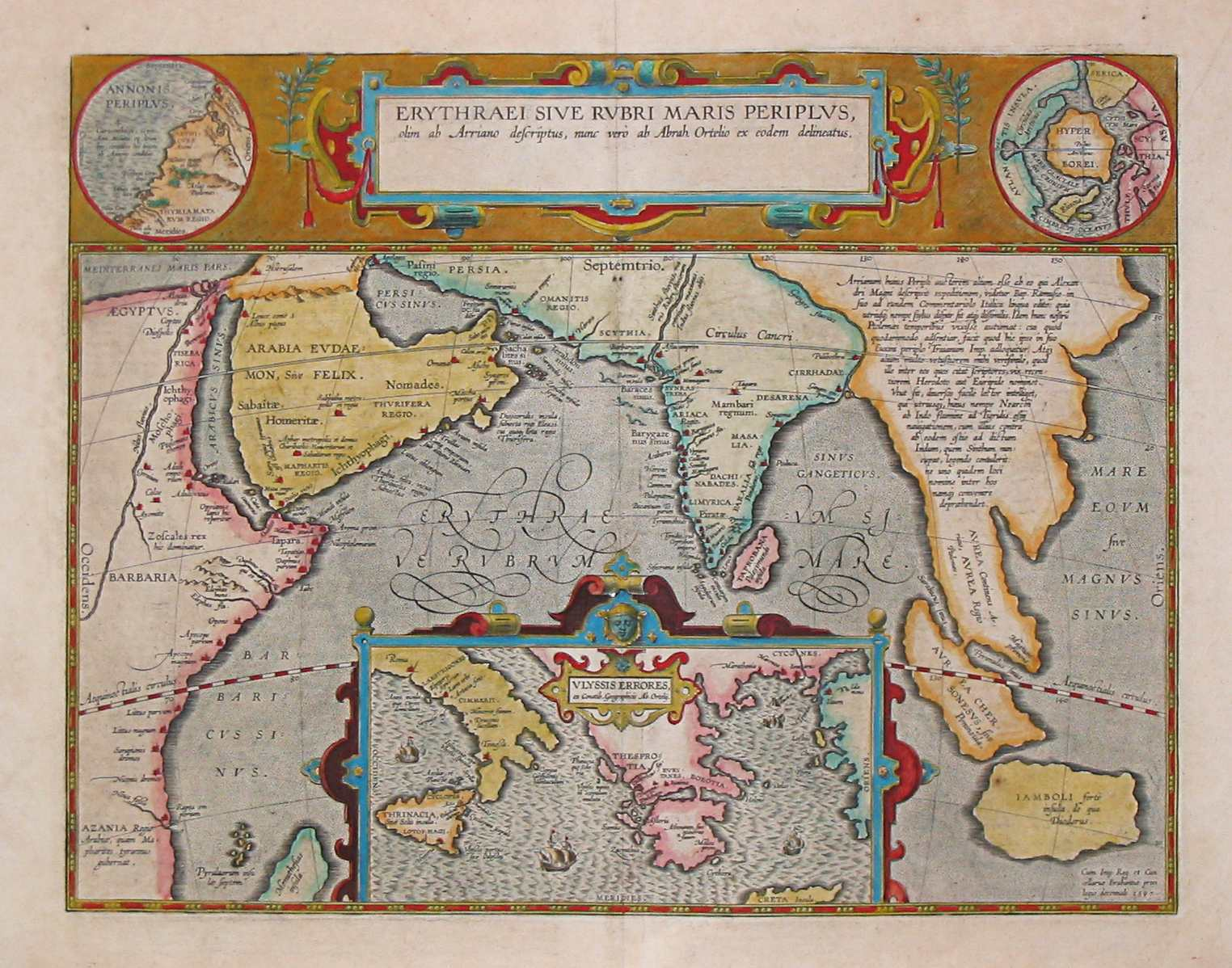
17th-century map depicting the locations of the Periplus of the Erythraean Sea.

== Classic literature sources ==
Chronological listing of classical literature sources for Erythraean:

- Herodotus, Herodotus 1. 18 (trans. Godley) (Greek history C5th BC)
- Herodotus, Herodotus 1. 142
- Herodotus, Herodotus 1. 180 (The Greek Classics ed. Miller 1909 Vol 5 p. 96 trans. Laurent)
- Herodotus, Clio Book 1 (trans. Laurent)
- Herodotus 2. 11 (The Greek Classics ed. Miller 1909 Vol 5 p. 116 trans. Laurent)
- Herodotus 2. 158 (The Greek Classics ed. Miller 1909 Vol 5 p. 186)
- Herodotus 2. 159 (The Greek Classics ed. Miller 1909 Vol 5 p. 186 )
- Herodotus, Herodotus 6. 8. 8 ff (trans. Godley)
- Thucydides, Thucydides 8. 4 (trans. Smith) (Greek history C5th BC)
- Thucydides, Thucydides 8. 14
- Thucydides, Thucydides 8. 16
- Thucydides, Thucydides 8. 24
- Thucydides, Thucydides 8. 33
- Aeschylus, Fragment 105 (192) Prometheus Bound (trans. Weir Smyth) (Greek tragedy C5th BC)
- Aristotle, De Mundo 393b ff (ed. Ross trans. Forster) (Greek philosophy C4th BC)
- Tibullus, Tibullus 3. 4. 11 ff (trans. Postgate) (Latin poetry C1st BC)
- Diodorus Siculus, Library of History 14. 84. 4 ff (trans. Oldfather) (Greek history C1st BC)
- Parthenius, The Love Romances 9. 1 (The Story of Polycrite) (trans. Gaselee) (Greek poetry C1st BC)
- Strabo, Geography 7. 3. 6 (trans. Jones) (Greek geography C1st BC to C1st AD)
- Strabo, Geography 13. 1. 14
- Strabo, Geography 13. 1. 19
- Strabo, Geography 13. 1. 64
- Strabo, Geography 14. 1. 31
- Strabo, Geography 14. 1. 33
- Strabo, Geography 16. 3. 5
- Scholiast on Strabo, Geography 16. 3. 5 (The Geography of Strabo trans. Jones 1930 Vol 7 p. 305)
- Strabo, Geography 16. 4. 20
- Scholiast on Strabo, Geography 16. 4. 20 (The Geography of Strabo trans. Jones 1930 Vol 7 p. 305)
- Strabo, Geography 17. 1. 43
- Livy, The History of Rome 38. 39. 11 ff (trans. Moore) (Roman history C1st BC to C1st AD)
- Pliny, Natural History 4. 36. (trans. Bostock & Riley) (Roman history C1st AD)
- Pliny, Natural History 7. 57 (trans. Rackham)
- Pliny, Natural History 8. 73 (43)
- Pliny, Natural History 9. 54 ff
- Scholiast on Pliny, Natural History 9. 54 ff (The Natural History of Pliny trans. Bostock & Riley 1855 Vol 2 p. 431)
- Pliny, Natural History 12. 35 (trans. Bostock & Riley)
- Bacchylides papyrus, The Drinking-song (Lyra Graeca trans. Edmonds 1927 Vol. 3 p. 657) (Greek poetry C1st AD)
- Statius, Silvae 4. 6. 17 (trans. Mozley) (Roman epic poetry C1st AD)
- Statius, Thebaid 7. 564 ff (trans. Mozley)
- Josephus, Berossus from Alexander Polyhistor, Of the Cosmogony and Causes of the Deluge (The Ancient Fragments trans. Cory 1828 p. 19) (Romano-Jewish-Babylonian history C1st AD)
- Plutarch, Moralia, Bravery of Women, 3 (The Women of Chios) 244F ff (trans. Babbitt) (Greek history C1st to C2nd AD)
- Plutarch, Moralia, Bravery of Women 17 (Polycrite) 254C ff
- Plutarch, Moralia, The Greek Questions (30) 298B ff
- Pausanias, Description of Greece 7. 5. 3 ff (trans. Frazer) (Greek travelogue C2nd AD)
- Pausanias, Description of Greece 7. 5. 5. 12 ff
- Pausanias, Description of Greece 10. 12. 4
- Athenaeus, Banquet of the Learned 4. 74 (trans. Yonge) (Greek rhetoric C2nd AD to C3rd AD)
- Athenaeus, Banquet of the Learned 10. 44 ff
- Athenaeus, Banquet of the Learned 11. 49 ff
- Dio, Roman History, Epitome of Book LXVIII 28. 3 ff (trans. Cary) (Roman history C2nd to C3rd AD)
- Eusebius, Berossus from Apollodorus, Of The Chaldean Kings (The Ancient Fragments trans. Cory 1828 p. 19) (Christian-Babylonian history 4th AD)
- Tzetzes, Chiliades or Book of Histories 8.57. 621 (trans. Untila et al.) (Greco-Byzantine history C12th AD)
- Tzetzes, Chiliades or Book of Histories 8.57. 628 ff

Classical literature source for Erythean:

- Ovid, Fasti 1. 543–586 (trans. Frazer) (Roman epic poetry C1st BC to C1st AD)

== See also ==
- Indo-Roman trade relations
- Sea of Zanj
- Socotra
