= Solis Lacus =

Lacus on Mars

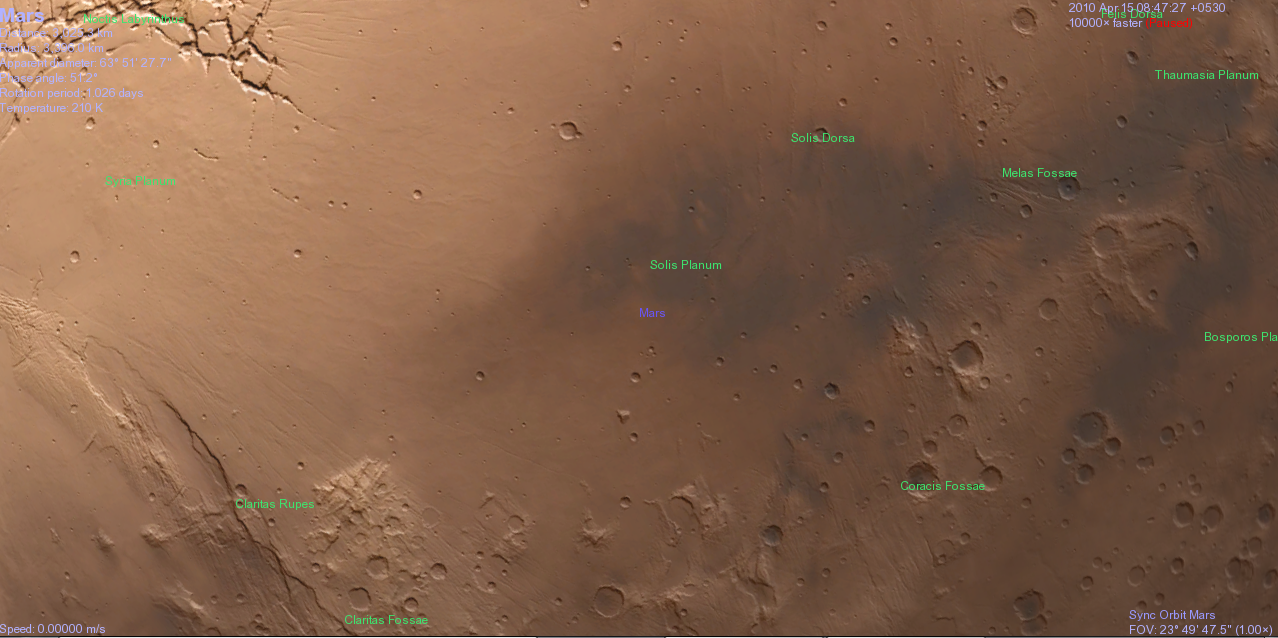
Solis Lacus feature on Mars. Screenshot from Celestia

Solis Lacus /ˈsɒlɪs ˈleɪkəs/ (26°S 85°W), (Latin, "lake of the sun") is a dark feature on Mars. It was once called "Oculus" and is still commonly called "The Eye of Mars" because with the surrounding light area called Thaumasia it resembles the pupil of an eye. Solis Lacus is known for the variability of its appearance, changing its size and shape when dust storms occur.

Percival Lowell believed that it was the planetary capital of Mars due to the number of canals he claimed intersected at the region.

== In science fiction ==
In The Lost Worlds of 2001, Arthur C. Clarke had it as the landing site of the first robotic probe to Mars. In Robert Heinlein's Stranger in a Strange Land, the crewed exploratory vessel Envoy lands just south of Solis Lacus. In Larry Niven's Known Space universe, Solis Lacus was the site of an early human base which was destroyed by the native Martians, and later featured in his novel, Protector. In the novel Lake of the Sun by Australian author Wynne Whiteford, the Solis Lacus crater was chosen as a base site by the Earthers as it had a slightly thicker atmosphere.
