= Libya Montes =

Highland terrain on Mars up-lifted by a giant impact

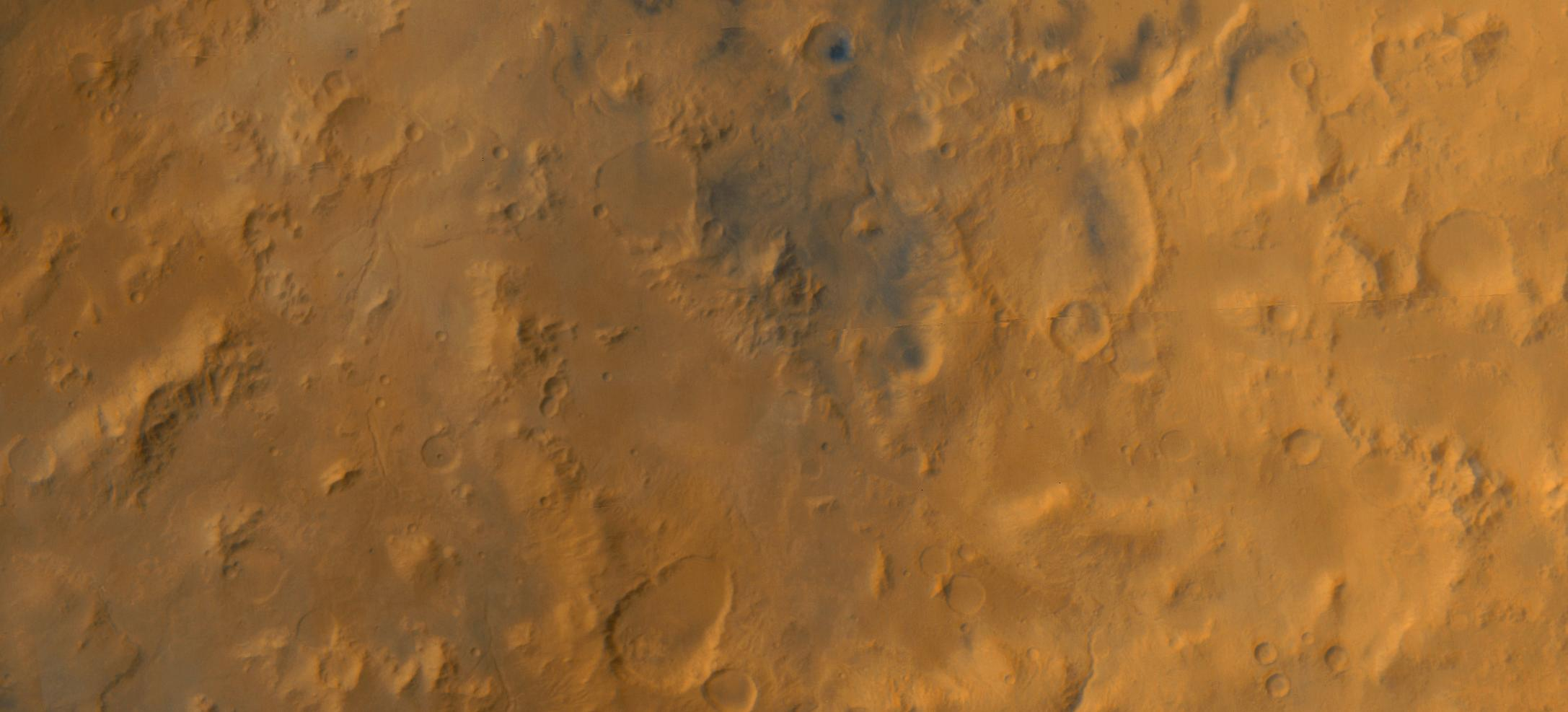
- Coordinates: 1.44°N 88.23°E
- Diameter: 1229 km

The Libya Montes are a highland terrain on Mars up-lifted by the giant impact that created the Isidis basin to the north.

During 1999, this region became one of the top two that were being considered for the canceled Mars Surveyor 2001 Lander. The Isidis basin is very ancient. Thus, the Libya Montes that form the southern Isidis basin rim contain some of the oldest rocks available at the Martian surface, and a landing in this region might potentially provide information about conditions on early Mars.

After they formed by the Isidis impact, the Libya Montes were subsequently modified by a large variety of processes, including fluvial activity, wind erosion and impact cratering. In particular, precipitation induced surface runoff and groundwater seepage resulted in the formation of fluvial landforms, i.e., dense valley networks, broad and elongated valleys, delta deposits, alluvial fans, open-basin paleolakes and coastlines. Crater size - frequency distribution measurements ("crater counting") revealed that the majority of valleys were formed early in Martian history (more than 3.7 billion years ago, Late Noachian). However, recent studies show that the formation of valleys continued throughout the Middle Ages of Mars (Hesperian period) and stopped 3.1 billion years ago in the Late Hesperian.

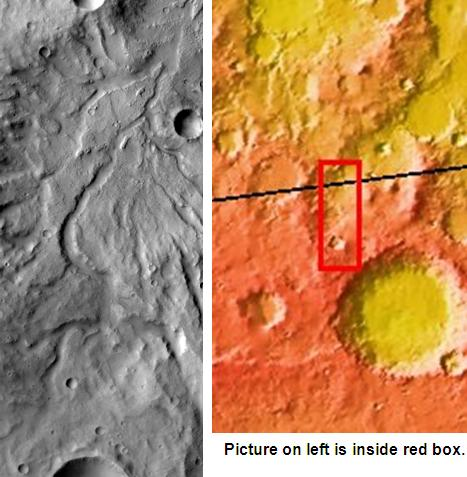
Libya Montes in Iapygia quadrangle with valley networks, as seen by THEMIS.

== Face ==
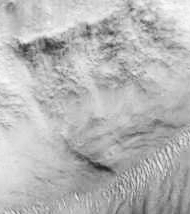
Sometimes called the Crowned Face.

Libya Montes has a facelike formation that appears even when viewed at different angles and with different sun angles. It can be found in the Mars Global Surveyor, MOC narrow-angle image M02-03051, located here (MSSS) or here (by USGS) (Crop). Also in HiRISE image ESP 018368 1830 (non-map projected) and ESP 018223 1830—a stereo pair that allows 3D terrain data to be generated. Like the more famous Face on Mars, it is an example of pareidolia.

External image
- MOC Image M02-03051 (1999) facial pareidolia is about half-way down
