= Tara =

Tara may refer to:

== Arts and entertainment ==
=== Film and television ===
- Tara (1992 film), an Indian film directed by Bijaya Jena
- Tara (2001 film), an American film, also known as Hood Rat, directed by Leslie Small
- Tara (2010 film), a Bengali film directed by Bratyo Basu
- Tara (2013 film), an Indian film directed by Kumar Raj
- Tara (TV series), soap opera that aired on Zee TV
- The Amazing Race Asia, a reality game show on the AXN network
  - Acronym for The Amazing Race Australia, a reality game show on Network Ten

=== Music ===
- T-ara, a South Korean girl group
- Tara Music, a label featuring traditional Irish music
- Tara (Absu album)
- "Tara" (song), a song on Moya Brennan's 2003 album Two Horizons
- Tara (Yano album)
- "Tara", a song by Roxy Music on the 1982 album Avalon (Roxy Music album)

=== Fictional settings ===
- Tara (plantation), fictional home of Scarlett O'Hara in Gone with the Wind
- Tara, a planet, setting of the Doctor Who serial The Androids of Tara
- Tara, a fictional town, the setting for the 1970 film The Spider's Stratagem

== Biology ==
- Tara (plant), a genus of legumes
- Tara (spider), a genus of jumping spiders
- Tara tree (Caesalpitarania spinosa), native to Peru
- Lemuropisum edule, a shrub called tara in Malagasy
- Tara, a theoretical founding ancestor of Haplogroup T
- A Vitis rotundifolia grape variety
- White-fronted tern (Sterna striata), tara in Māori
- Calamus erectus, sometimes called tara in Chinese

== Companies and media ==
- Țara, a newspaper from the Republic of Moldova
- Tara Air, a Nepalese airline
- Tara International, Indian marketer for Tara Green Auto
- Tara Labs, a manufacturer of high-end audio products
- Tara Muzik, a defunct Indian Bengali music channel
- Tara Newz, a defunct Indian Bengali news channel
- Tara Television (or Tara TV), an Irish cable and satellite channel

== People ==
- Tara (given name), including a list of people and fictional characters
- Tara (surname)
- Tara (Assamese actress) (1944–2007), former Indian film actress
- Tara (Kannada actress) (born 1967), stage name of Indian actress and politician Anuradha
- Tara (wrestler) (born 1971), ring name of professional wrestler Lisa Marie Varon
- Tära (born 2003), stage name of Palestinian-Italian singer-songwriter Tamara Al Zool
- Tara the Southern Belle (died 2009), a member of the Southern Belles tag-team from the Gorgeous Ladies of Wrestling

== Places ==
=== Natural features ===
- Tara (Drina), a river in Montenegro and Bosnia and Herzegovina, a tributary of the Drina
- Tara (Irtysh), a river in Russia (in Novosibirsk and Omsk Oblasts), a tributary of the Irtysh
- Tara, an older name for the river Tragus, in Greece (in Arcadia)
- Tara, Saga, town, mountain and mountain range in Japan (in Saga Prefecture)
- Tara Mountain, Serbia
- Tara National Park, Serbia
- Tara Island, Sulu Archipelago, Philippines
- Tara Hill, County Wexford, Ireland, a hill and a village
- Hill of Tara, County Meath, Ireland, a ritual site of ancient high kings of Ireland
- Salar de Tara, a salt pan in Chile
- 5863 Tara, an asteroid

=== Populated places ===
==== Africa ====
- "Tara", Cairo, a squatted villa on Gezira Island, Cairo, Egypt, made notorious by its SOE occupants during World War II
- Tara, Zambia, a village in the Southern Province of Zambia
- Tara Subcounty, a region in Maracha District, Uganda

==== Asia ====
- Tara, Iran, a village in Mazandaran Province
- Tara, Nepal, a village in Baglung District in the Dhawalagiri Zone of central Nepal
- Tara, Russia, several inhabited localities
- Tara, Saga, a town, mountain, and mountain range in Saga Prefecture, Japan

==== Australia ====
- Tara, Northern Territory, a locality in the Barkly Region
- Tara, Queensland, a town
- Tara County, New South Wales
- Shire of Tara, Queensland

==== Europe ====
- Hill of Tara, an ancient site in County Meath, Republic of Ireland
- Tara, County Down, a townland in the civil parish of Witter, County Down, Northern Ireland
- Tara, County Offaly, a townland in the civil parish of Durrow, barony of Ballycowan, Republic of Ireland

==== North America ====
- Tara, Florida, US, an unincorporated area
- Tara, Ontario, village in Canada
- Tara Hills, California, a CDP
- Tara Township, Minnesota (disambiguation), several places in the US

== Religion ==
- In Hinduism:
  - Tara (Mahavidya), a Tantric goddess
  - Tara (Ramayana), the wife of the monkey king Vali
  - Tara (Hindu goddess), the wife of Brihaspati
- Tara (Buddhism), a tantric meditation deity in Tibetan Buddhism
- Tara, a sea goddess in Polynesian mythology
- Tara (mythology), a name of one of the Hesperides attested on a vase

== Schools ==
- Tara Anglican School for Girls, North Parramatta, New South Wales, Australia
- Tara High School, Baton Rouge, Louisiana, US
- Tara Institute, a Tibetan Buddhist center in Melbourne, Australia

== Titles ==
- Baron Brabazon of Tara, a UK title
- Baron Tara, an Irish title
- Kingship of Tara, a title in ancient Ireland
- Viscount Tara, an Irish title

== Transportation ==
- Tara Air, a Nepalese airline
- Tara, an oceanic research vessel used for the Tara expedition
- Tara Field, an airport in Georgia, US
- Tara Station, a railway station in Saga Prefecture, Japan
- Tara Street, a major traffic route in Dublin, Ireland
- Tara Street railway station in Dublin, Ireland
- IKCO Tara, a car

== Other uses ==
- HMS Tara, several Royal Navy ships
- Đurđevića Tara Bridge, a bridge over the Tara River in northern Montenegro
- Tārā, Tahitian slang for 5 CFP francs
- Tara (cat), a family cat who saved a four-year-old boy from a dog attack
- Tara (Northern Ireland), a loyalist group
- Tara, Chertsey, a house in Surrey, UK, previously the home of drummer Keith Moon
- Tara Brooch, an artifact from Ireland
- Tara Hurdle, a horse race in Ireland
- Tara Mine, a zinc and lead mine near Navan, County Meath, Ireland
- Tara Theatre, an art house movie theater in Atlanta named after the plantation in Gone With the Wind
- Timed antagonistic response alethiometer, a type of lie detection technique
- Tāra, Māori language name for New Zealand dollar
- Yugoslav submarine Nebojša, or Tara, a submarine of the Yugoslav Navy

== See also ==
- Battle of Tara (disambiguation), a number of battles
- Golden Tara, a Majapahit period (Indonesia) gold image of a Hindu goddess
- Hurricane Tara (disambiguation), three tropical cyclones in the Eastern Pacific Ocean
- Taras (disambiguation)
- Taara or Tharapita, a god in Estonian mythology
- Terah, a biblical figure
- Tera (disambiguation)
- Terra (disambiguation)
