= Thera (disambiguation) =

Thera is a Greek island also known as Santorini.

Thera or Thira may also refer to:

== Places ==
- Thera, one of the ancient names of the city of Gümüşhane, Turkey
- Thera (Caria), a town of ancient Caria, now in Turkey
- Thira (crater), impact crater on Mars
- Thira (regional unit) of Greece

== Monks ==
- Thero or "Thera", an honorific term for senior, fully ordained Buddhist monks; traditionally one ordained for 10 or more years
- Thero, an elder monk of Theravada Buddhism; hence its etymology "Thera-vada", "Tradition of the Elders"

== Arts, entertainment, and media ==
- Thera, the capital of the fictional Theran Empire, in the tabletop role-playing game Earthdawn
- Thira (film), a 2013 Malayalam thriller film
- Thirra, a ritual dance performed in temples of Malabar

== Other uses ==
- Thera (moth), a genus of moth

== See also ==
- Fira, the main municipality of Santorini
- Tera (disambiguation)
- Terra (disambiguation)
- Thara (disambiguation)
- Thero (disambiguation)
- Theri (disambiguation)
