= Clynotoides =

Scientific classification
- Kingdom: Animalia
- Phylum: Arthropoda
- Subphylum: Chelicerata
- Class: Arachnida
- Order: Araneae
- Infraorder: Araneomorphae
- Family: Salticidae
- Subfamily: incertae sedis
- Genus: Clynotoides; Mello-Leitão, 1944
- Species: C. dorae

Binomial name
- Clynotoides dorae Mello-Leitão, 1944

Genus of spiders

Clynotoides is a monotypic genus of Argentinian jumping spiders containing the single species, Clynotoides dorae. It was first described by Cândido Firmino de Mello-Leitão in 1944, and is only found in Argentina. The name is a reference to Clynotis, meaning "having the likeness of Clynotis".

Its taxonomic relationships within the family Salticidae are uncertain.
