= Thara =

Thara may refer to:

- Terah, father of Abraham
- Thara (1970 film), a 1970 Indian Malayalam film
- Thara, Gujarat, a town in north Gujarat, India
- Thara Ak-Var, a DC Comics character
- Thara Prashad (born 1982), American singer
  - Thara (album), 2007

== See also ==
- Tara (disambiguation)
- Thera (disambiguation)
