= Thero (disambiguation) =

Thero is an honorific term in Pali for senior bhikkhus (Buddhist monks)

It may also refer to:

- Thero (mythology), several figures in Greek mythology
- Thero Setsile (born 1995), Botswanan footballer
- Thero Wheeler (1945–2009), a founding member of the Symbionese Liberation Army left-wing terrorist organization
- Thero, Hooghly, a village in West Bengal, India

== See also ==
- Thera (disambiguation)
- Theri (disambiguation)
