= Clynotis knoxi =

Conservation status
- Naturally Uncommon (NZ TCS)

Scientific classification
- Kingdom: Animalia
- Phylum: Arthropoda
- Subphylum: Chelicerata
- Class: Arachnida
- Order: Araneae
- Infraorder: Araneomorphae
- Family: Salticidae
- Genus: Clynotis
- Species: C. knoxi

Binomial name
- Clynotis knoxi Forster, 1964

Species of spider

Clynotis knoxi is a species of jumping spider that is endemic to New Zealand.

== Taxonomy ==
This species was described by Ray Forster in 1964 from male and female specimens. The holotype is stored in Canterbury Museum.

== Description ==
The male is recorded at 4.96mm in length whereas the female is 5.48mm.

== Distribution ==
This species is only known from Snares Islands, New Zealand.

== Conservation status ==
Under the New Zealand Threat Classification System, this species is listed as "Naturally Uncommon" with the qualifiers of "Island Endemic" and "One Location".
