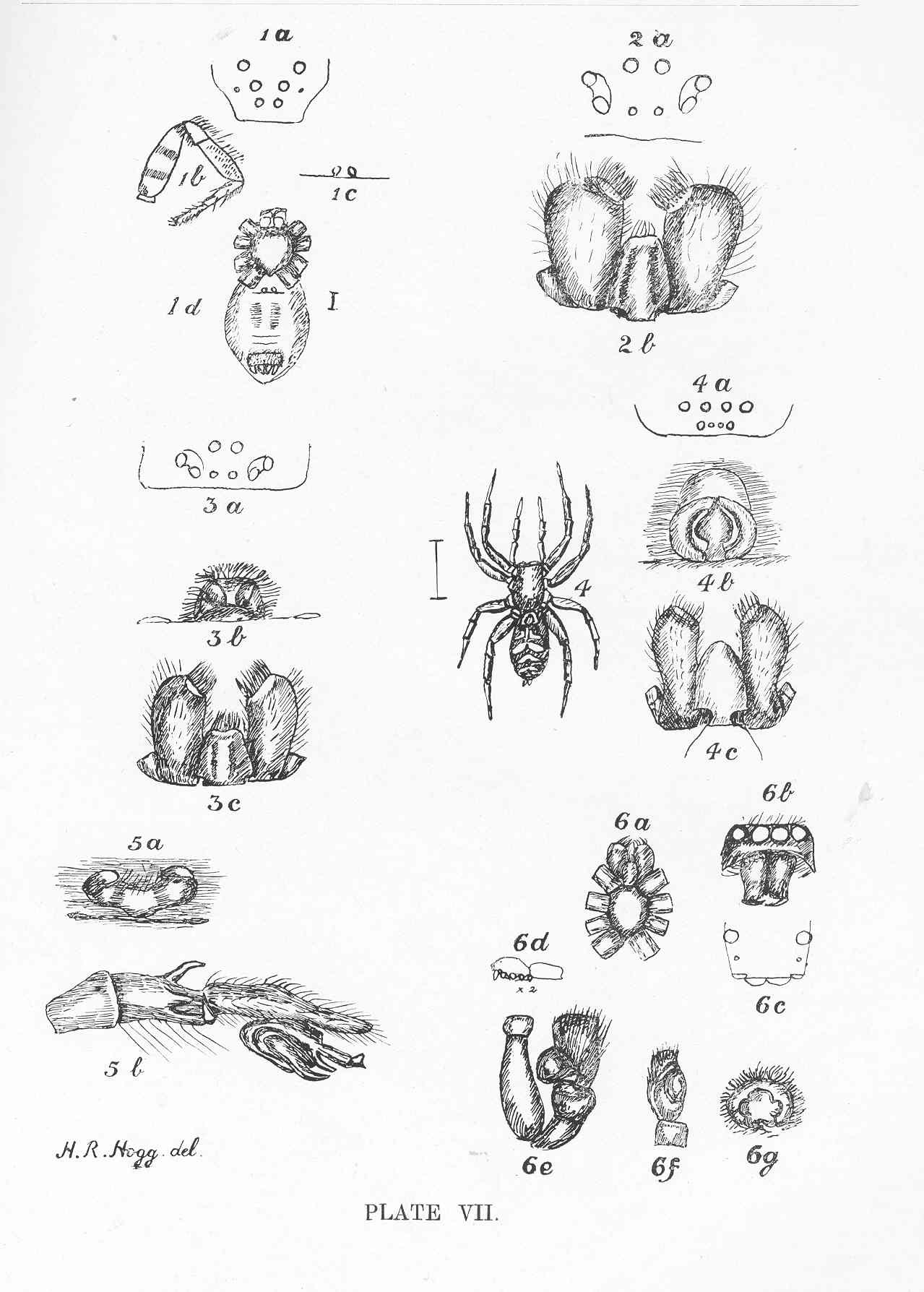
- Fig. 6.

Conservation status
- Not Threatened (NZ TCS)

Scientific classification
- Kingdom: Animalia
- Phylum: Arthropoda
- Subphylum: Chelicerata
- Class: Arachnida
- Order: Araneae
- Infraorder: Araneomorphae
- Family: Salticidae
- Genus: Clynotis
- Species: C. barresi

Binomial name
- Clynotis barresi Hogg, 1909

Synonyms
- Clynotis barresis

= Clynotis barresi =

Species of spider

Clynotis barresi is a species of jumping spider that is endemic to New Zealand.

== Taxonomy ==
This species was described as Clynotis barresis by Henry Roughton Hogg from male and female specimens. It was most recently revised in 1964.

== Description ==
The female is recorded at 7.12mm in length whereas the male is 6.21mm. The male cephalothorax and legs are yellow brown. The abdomen is creamy and mottled white. The female is similar to the male but is darker.

== Distribution ==
This species is only known from the Auckland Islands and Campbell Islands of New Zealand.

== Conservation status ==
Under the New Zealand Threat Classification System, this species is listed as "Not Threatened".
