= Clynotis saxatilis =

Conservation status
- Data Deficient (NZ TCS)

Scientific classification
- Kingdom: Animalia
- Phylum: Arthropoda
- Subphylum: Chelicerata
- Class: Arachnida
- Order: Araneae
- Infraorder: Araneomorphae
- Family: Salticidae
- Genus: Clynotis
- Species: C. saxatilis

Binomial name
- Clynotis saxatilis (Urquhart, 1886)

Synonyms
- Attus saxatilis

Species of spider

Clynotis saxatilis is a species of jumping spider that is endemic to New Zealand.

== Taxonomy ==
This species was described as Attus saxatilis by Arthur Urquhart in 1886 from a female specimen. It was most recently revised in 1935.

== Description ==
The female is recorded at 8.6mm in length. The cephalothorax is coloured dark brown. The abdomen is brownish grey.

== Distribution ==
This species is only known from Canterbury and Lake Tekapo, New Zealand.

== Conservation status ==
Under the New Zealand Threat Classification System, this species is listed as "Data Deficient" with the qualifiers of "Data Poor: Size" and "Data Poor: Trend".
