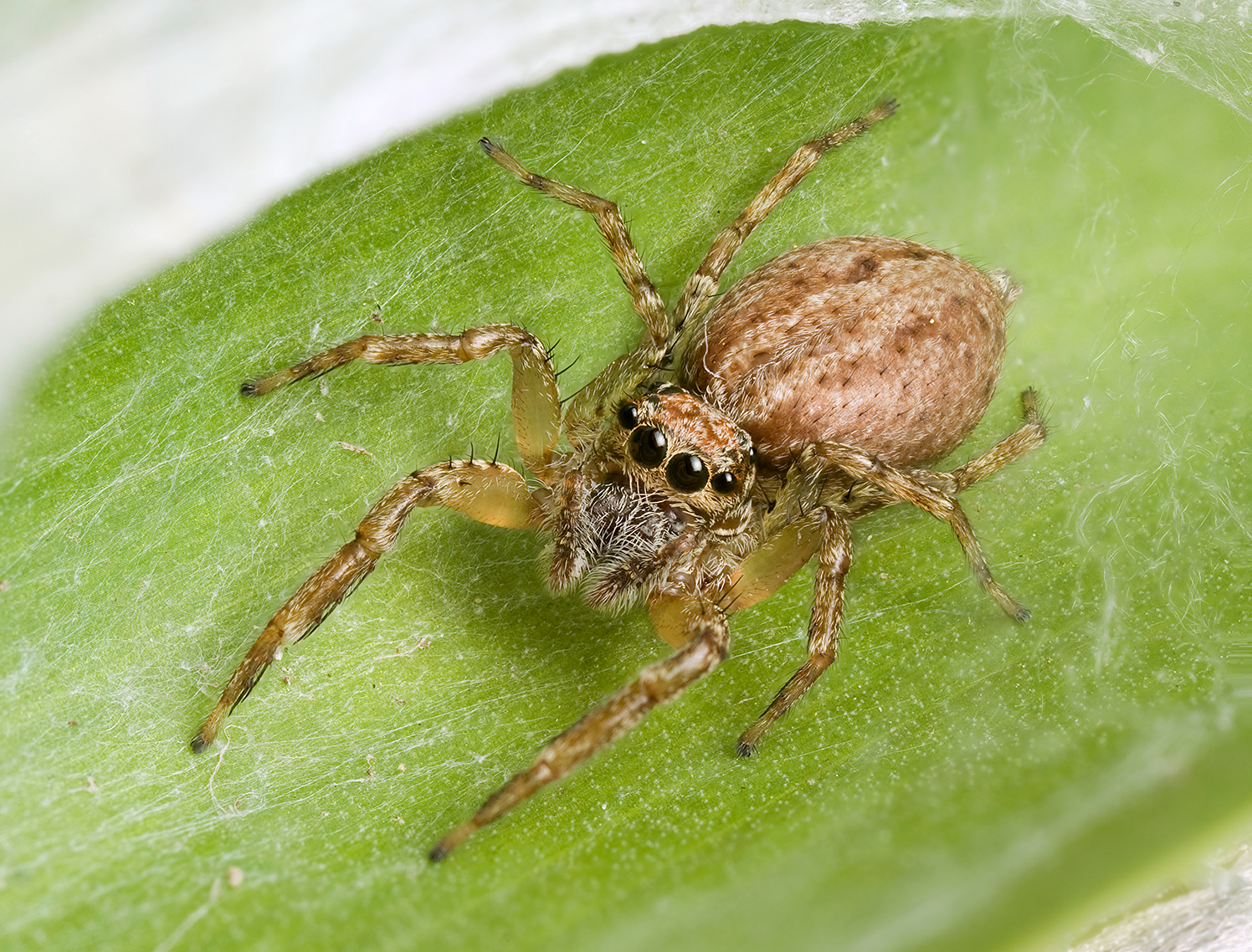
- Female Clynotis severus

Scientific classification
- Kingdom: Animalia
- Phylum: Arthropoda
- Subphylum: Chelicerata
- Class: Arachnida
- Order: Araneae
- Infraorder: Araneomorphae
- Family: Salticidae
- Subfamily: Salticinae
- Genus: Clynotis; Simon, 1901

Type species
- C. severus (L. Koch, 1879)

Species
- 5, see text

= Clynotis =

Genus of spiders

Clynotis is a genus of spiders in the family Salticidae, or jumping spiders, contained within the subfamily Marpissinae. They are found across Australia and New Zealand, with some species occupying the Auckland Islands and one found exclusively on Snares Island. There are eight species currently described within the genus, the earliest noted being the type species Clynotis severus, first described in Queensland, New South Wales, Australia in 1879 by Ludwig Carl Christian Koch. The most recent was described in 1931 by Lucien Berland. Two other species previously held within the genus were subsequently reclassified into the genus Tara.

As with most salticidae spiders, members of this genus are known for their ability to jump with agility, and for their strong vision. They are identifiable from the distinct shape of the cephalothorax and their eye patterns. Of their eight eyes, the front row of four feature a dramatically prominent anterior median pair, while the rear row of four eyes may be described as strongly bent, or as being rearranged into two rows, with two large posterior lateral eyes furthest back. These supply lateral vision, while the forward four are adapted to detailed, three-dimensional vision for purposes of estimating the range, direction, and nature of potential prey, permitting the spider to direct its attacking leaps with great precision.

Also in common with other salticidae, they use their silk for safety lines while jumping. They construct silken "pup tents", where they shelter from bad weather and sleep at night. They molt within these shelters, build and store egg cases within them, and also spend the winter in them.

== Species ==
As of June 2019 it contains five species, found only in Australia and New Zealand:

- Clynotis archeyi (Berland, 1931) – New Zealand (Auckland Is.)
- Clynotis barresi Hogg, 1909 – New Zealand
- Clynotis knoxi Forster, 1964 – New Zealand (Snares Is.)
- Clynotis saxatilis (Urquhart, 1886) – New Zealand
- Clynotis severus (L. Koch, 1879) (type) – Australia
