= Theri =

Theri may refer to:

- Theri (film), a 2016 Indian Tamil-language film by Atlee Kumar
  - Theri (soundtrack), 2016 soundtrack album by G. V. Prakash Kumar
- Theri, honorific term in Pali for senior bhikkhunis (Buddhist nuns)

== See also ==
- Thero (disambiguation)
- Thera (disambiguation)
