= HMS Tara =

HMS Tara may refer to the following ships of the Royal Navy:

- HMS Tara (1914)
- HMS Tara (1918)

== See also ==
- Tara (disambiguation)
