= Tempe Terra =

Terra on Mars

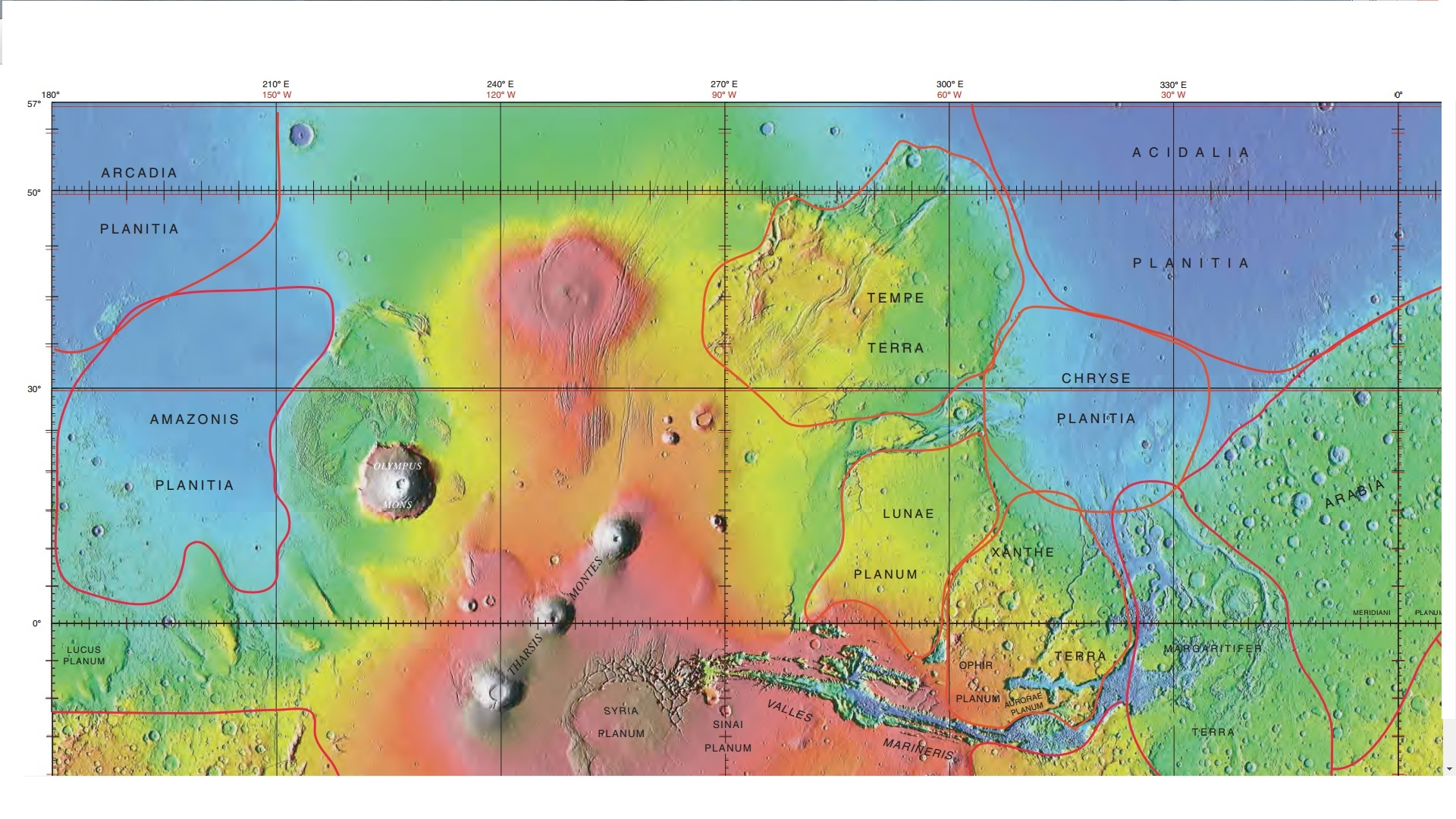
MOLA map showing boundaries for Tempe Terra and other regions. Colors indicate elevations.

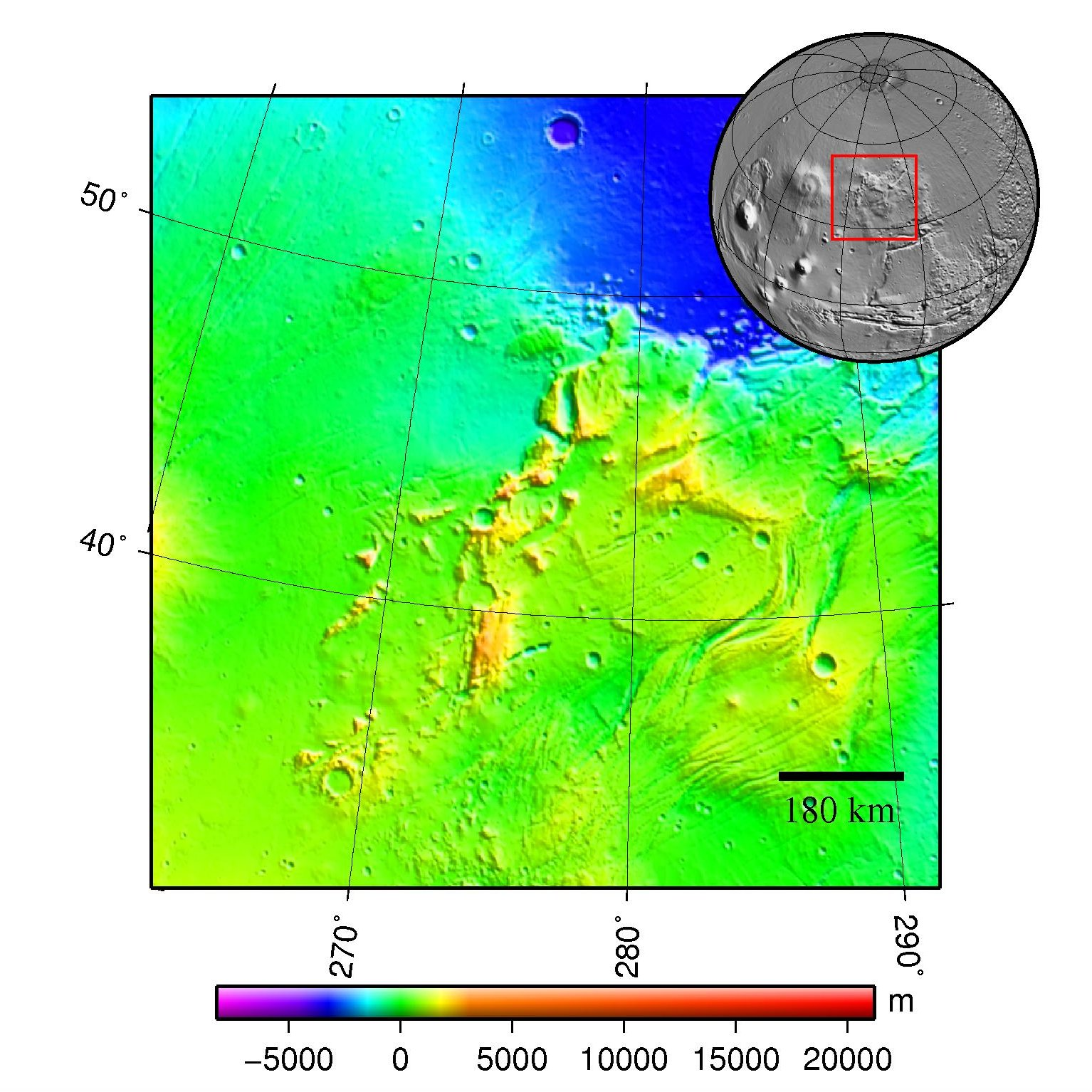
Location and topographic map of central Tempe Terra region.

Tempe Terra is a heavily cratered highland region in the northern hemisphere of the planet Mars. Located at the northeastern edge of the Tharsis volcanic province, Tempe Terra is notable for its high degree of crustal fracturing and deformation. The region also contains many small shield volcanoes, lava flows, and other volcanic structures.

The region is named after the albedo feature Tempe, first used by astronomer E.M. Antoniadi in 1930 to describe a bright patch of terrain centered near 40°N, 70°W. The name comes from the Vale of Tempe, a valley located south of Mount Olympus and celebrated by the ancient Greeks for its beauty. The International Astronomical Union (IAU) formally designated the region Tempe Terra in 1979. Terra (pl. terrae) is a Latin descriptor term used in planetary geology for continent-like highland regions (i.e., extensive land masses) on other planets.

== Location and description ==
Tempe Terra is located in the eastern half of the Arcadia quadrangle (MC-03) and the western edge of the Mare Acidalium quadrangle (MC-04) in Mars' western hemisphere. It is centered at 39.7°N 289°E and spans about 2,700 km at its broadest extent. The region extends from about 30° to 54°N and from 265° to 310°E, covering approximately 2.1 million km^{2}, or an area roughly equivalent to that of Saudi Arabia. It is bordered to the east by Chryse and Acidalia Planitiae, to the north by the low-lying plains of Arcadia and Vastitas Borealis, and to the south by the huge outflow channel system of Kasei Valles.

== Geology ==
Tempe Terra occupies a transition zone between the old, heavily cratered highlands of the Martian south and the geologically younger, lowland terrain of the north. Tempe Terra contains the northernmost exposures of ancient highland crust on the planet. The region is transected by large numbers of linear to curvilinear normal faults and grabens with ages that span much of Mars' geologic history. Research on extension, or rifts in the crust, has suggested Tempa Terra may be the most highly strained geologic region on Mars with a lot of low shield volcanoes.

There is evidence of valleys in Tempe Terra, including stream meanders, as in the image below.

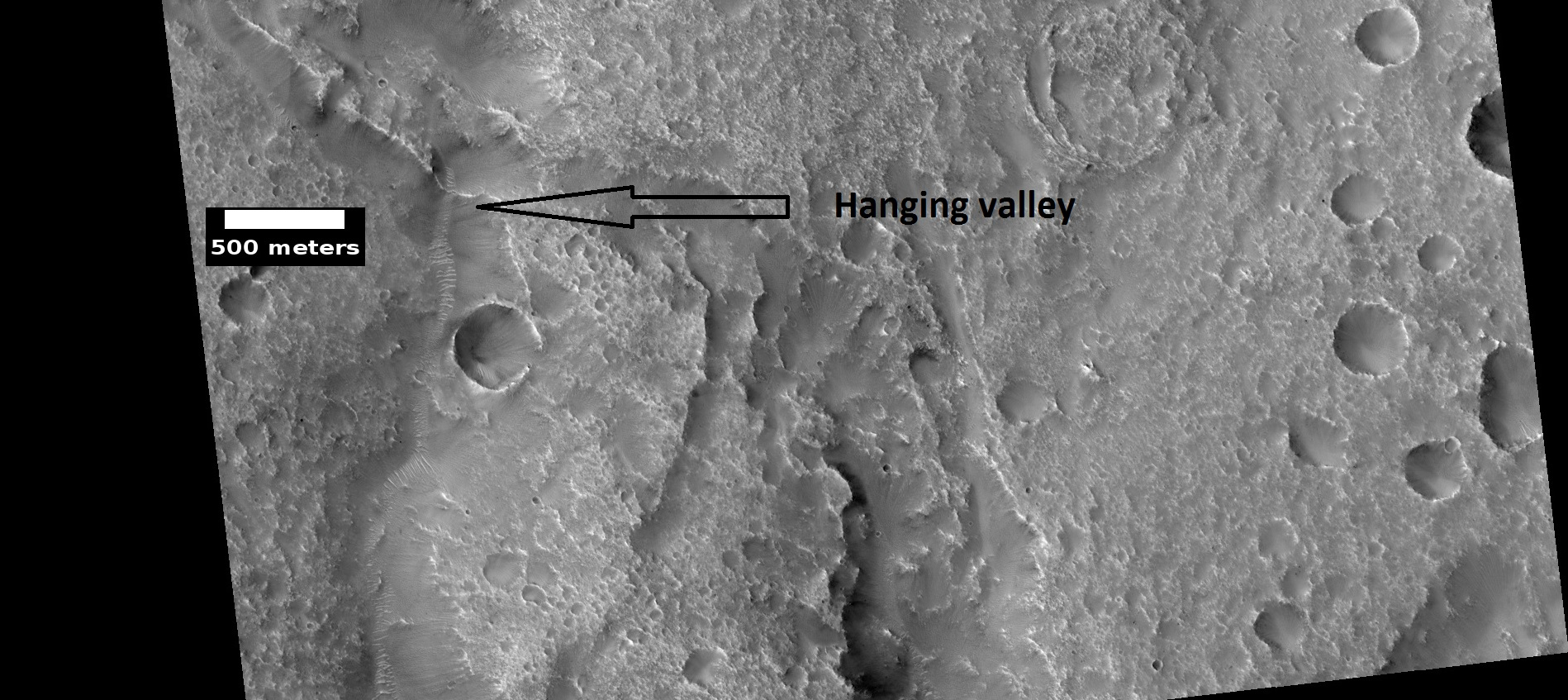
Hanging valley, as seen by HiRISE under HiWish program This may have been a waterfall at one time.

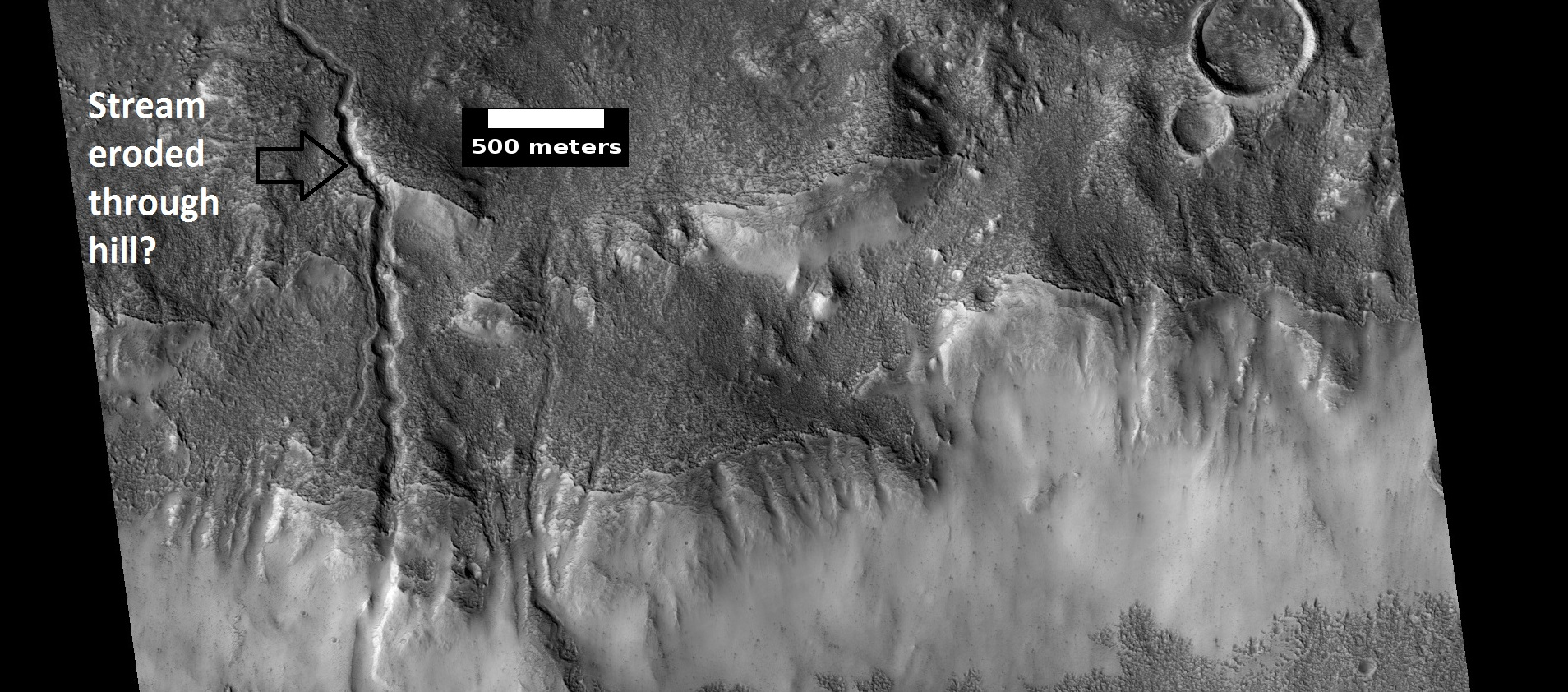
Channels, as seen by HiRISE under HiWish program. Stream appears to have eroded through a hill.

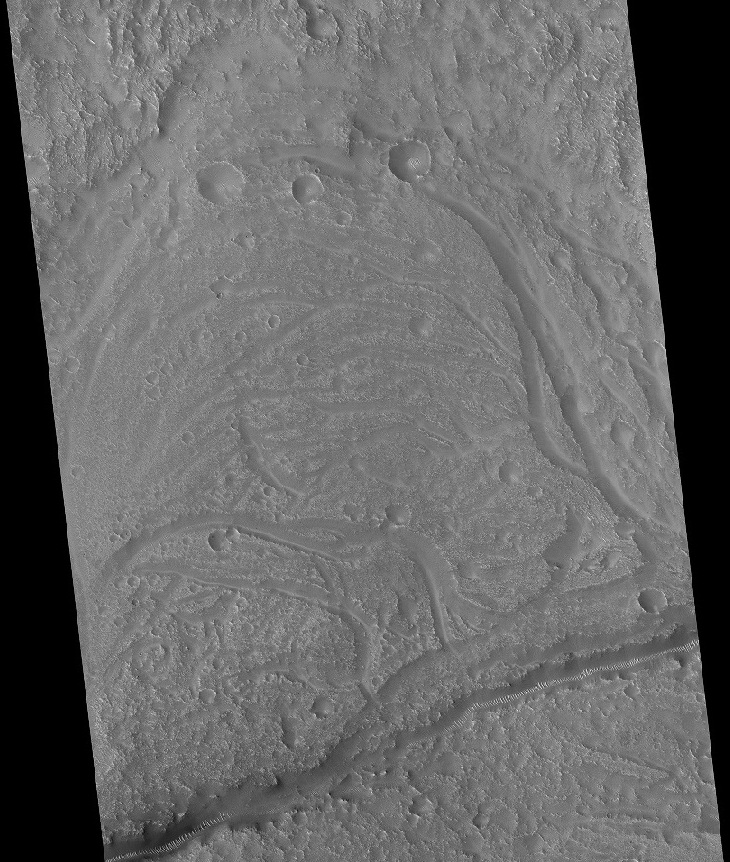
Stream meander and cutoff, as seen by HiRISE under HiWish program.

== Gullies ==
Martian gullies are small, incised networks of narrow channels and their associated downslope sediment deposits, found on the planet of Mars. They are named for their resemblance to terrestrial gullies. First discovered on images from Mars Global Surveyor, they occur on steep slopes, especially on the walls of craters. Usually, each gully has a dendritic alcove at its head, a fan-shaped apron at its base, and a single thread of incised channel linking the two, giving the whole gully an hourglass shape. They are believed to be relatively young because they have few, if any craters. A subclass of gullies is also found cut into the faces of sand dunes which themselves considered to be quite young. On the basis of their form, aspects, positions, and location amongst and apparent interaction with features thought to be rich in water ice, many researchers believed that the processes carving the gullies involve liquid water. However, this remains a topic of active research. The pictures below show a variety of gullies and gully features.

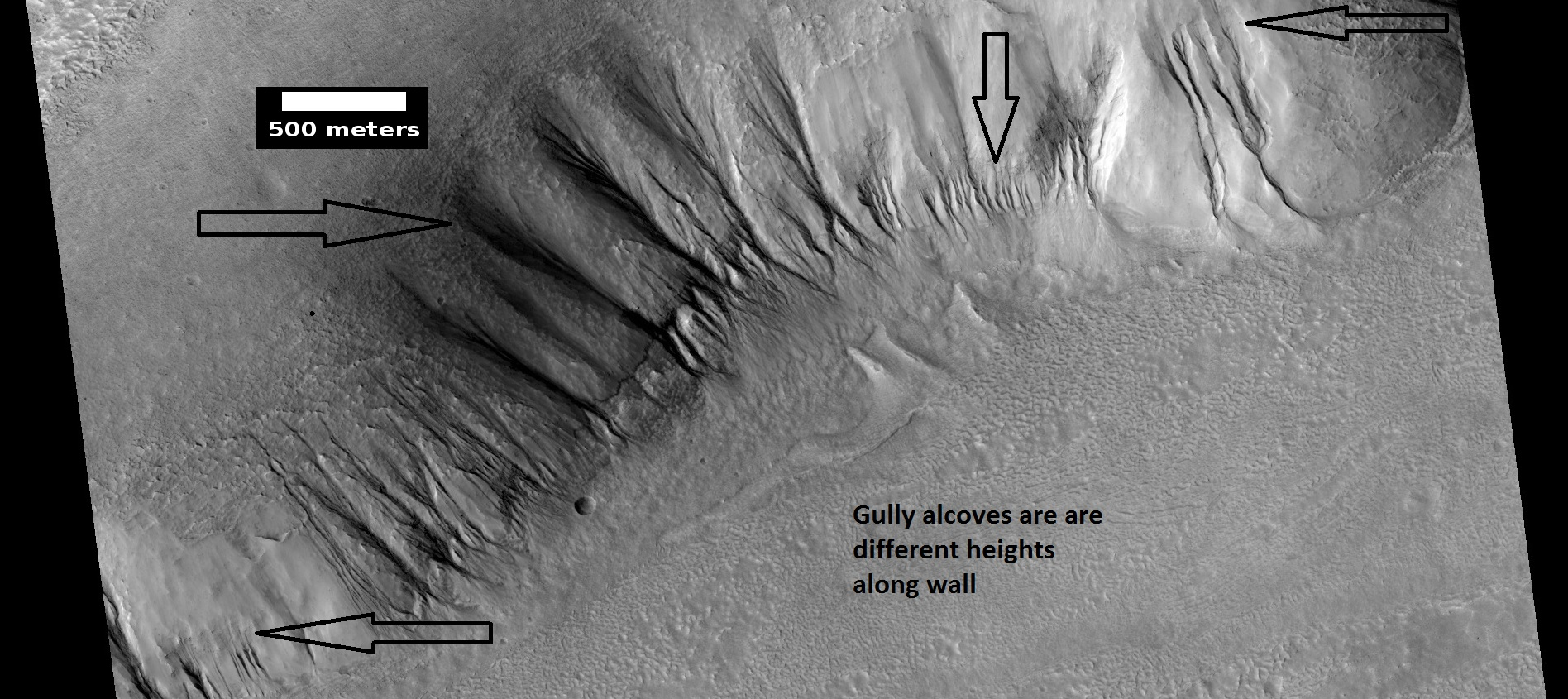
A variety of gullies originating at different levels are visible in this HiRISE image that was taken under the HiWish program.

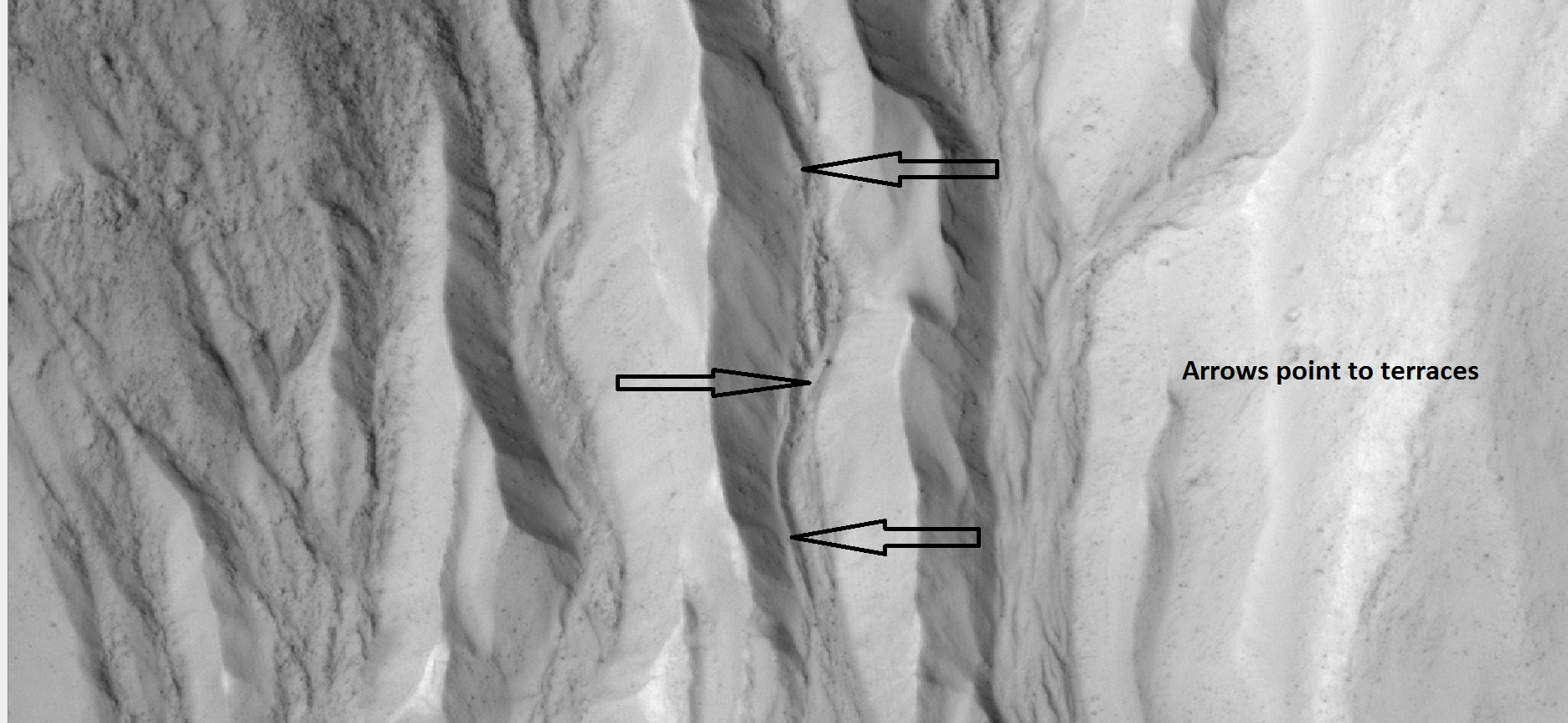
This enlargement of a small part of the previous image shows terraces along a gully channel. The terraces were created when a new channel cut through the old surface. This means that the gully was not in a single event. Water must have flowed more than once in this location.

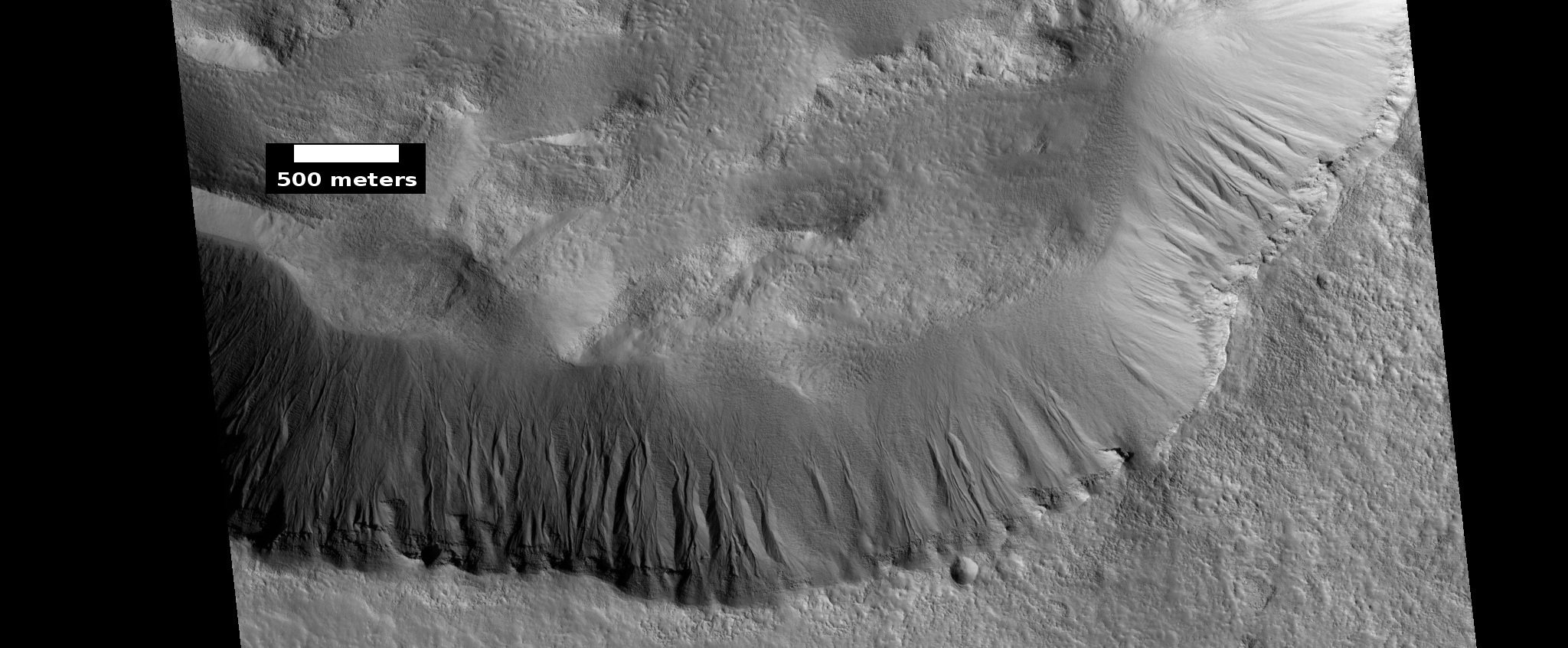
Gullies in a crater. Some seem to be young, others are well developed. Picture was taken by HiRISE under the HiWish program.

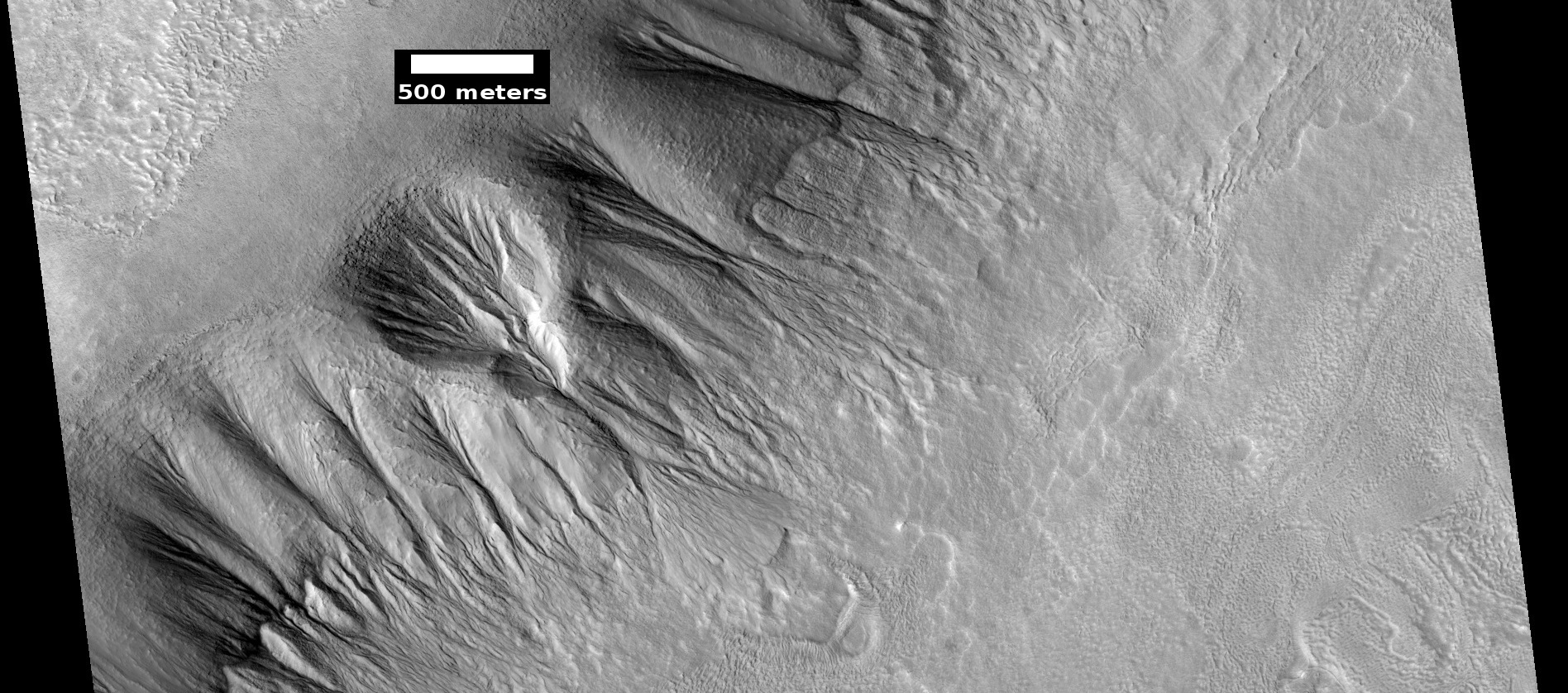
Gullies along mesa wall in North Tempe Terra, as seen by HiRISE under HiWish program

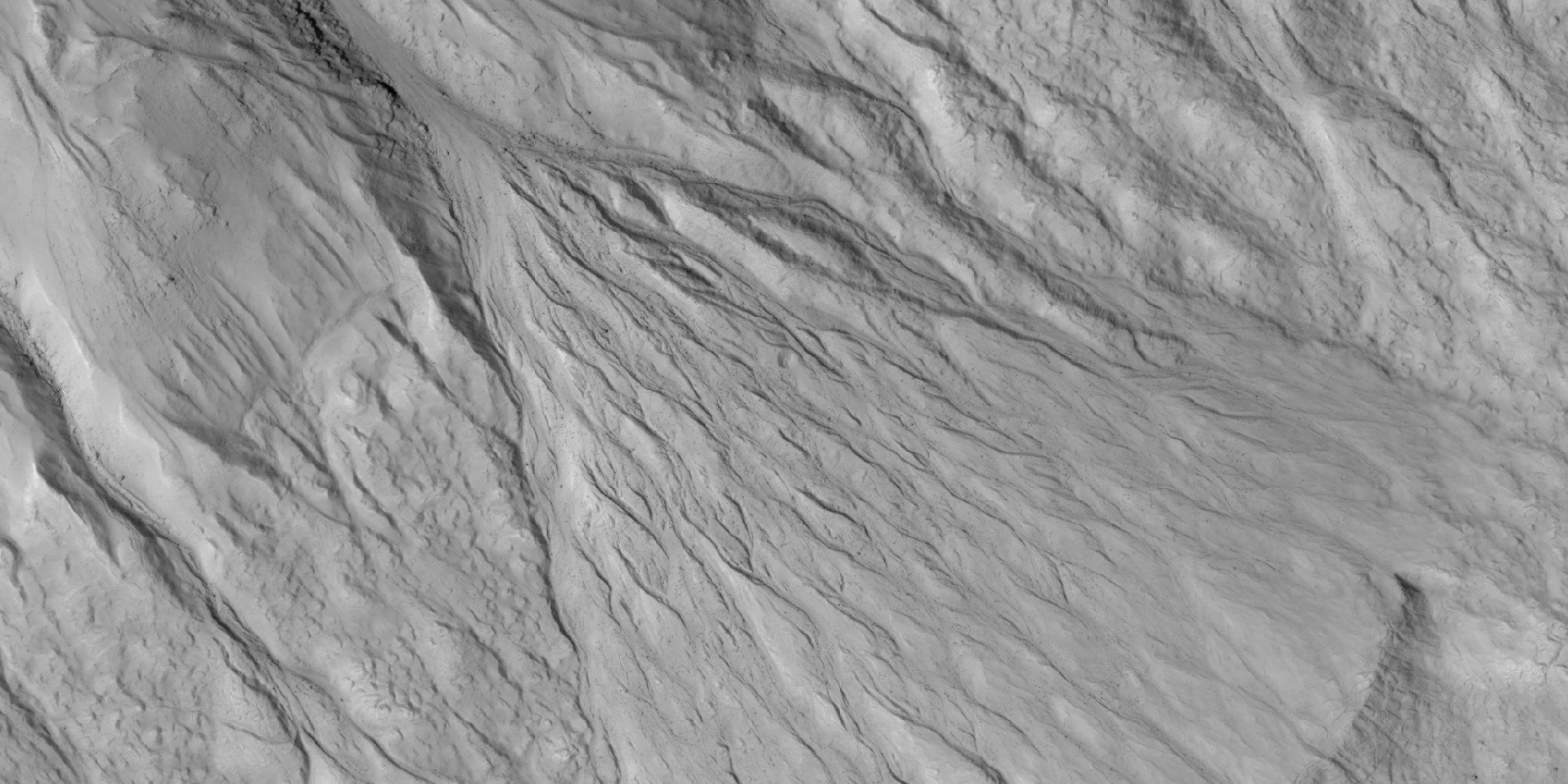
Close view of gully apron, as seen by HiRISE under HiWish program Note this is an enlargement of the previous image.

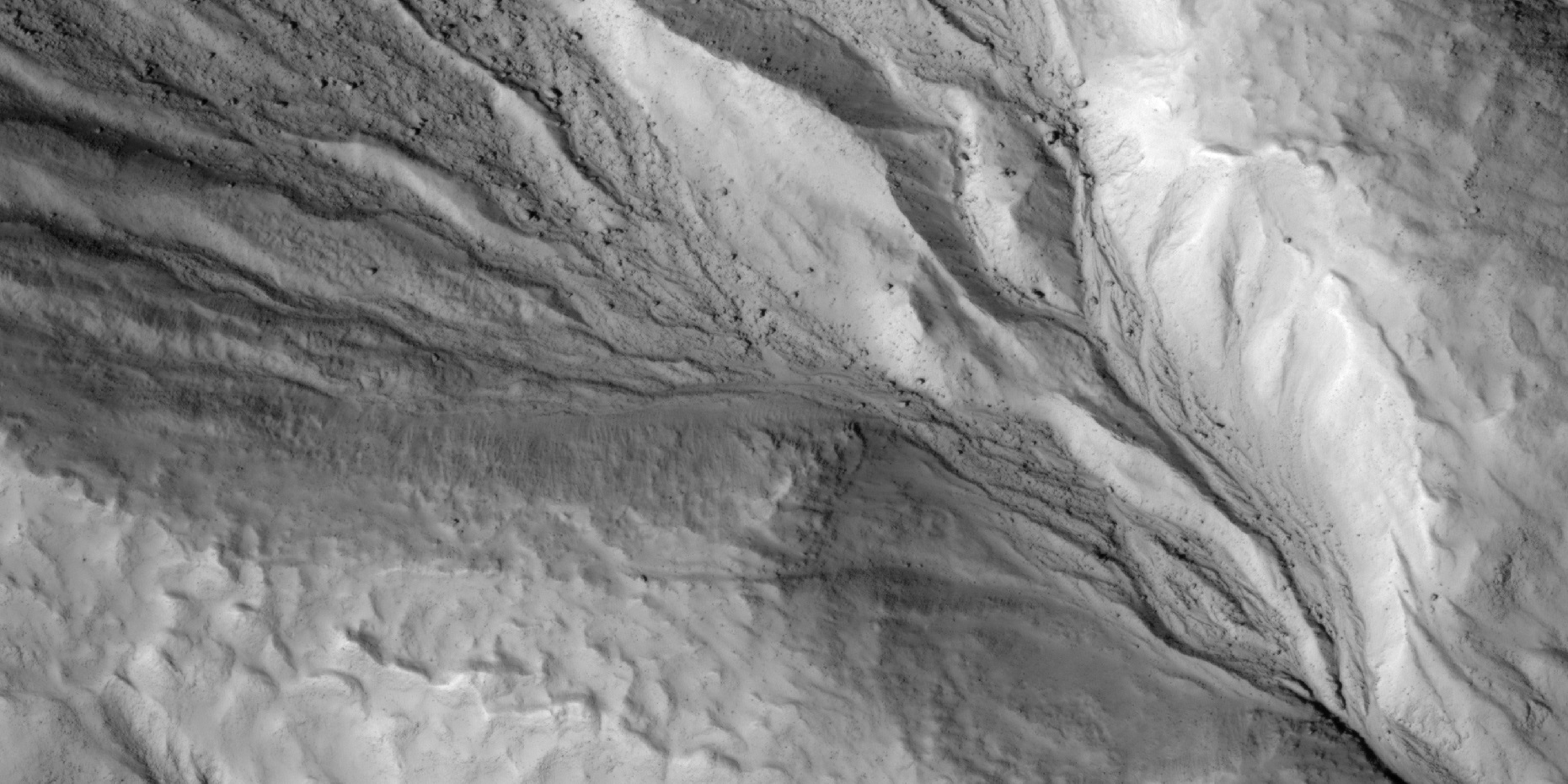
Close view of gully alcove, as seen by HiRISE under HiWish program Note this is an enlargement of a previous image.

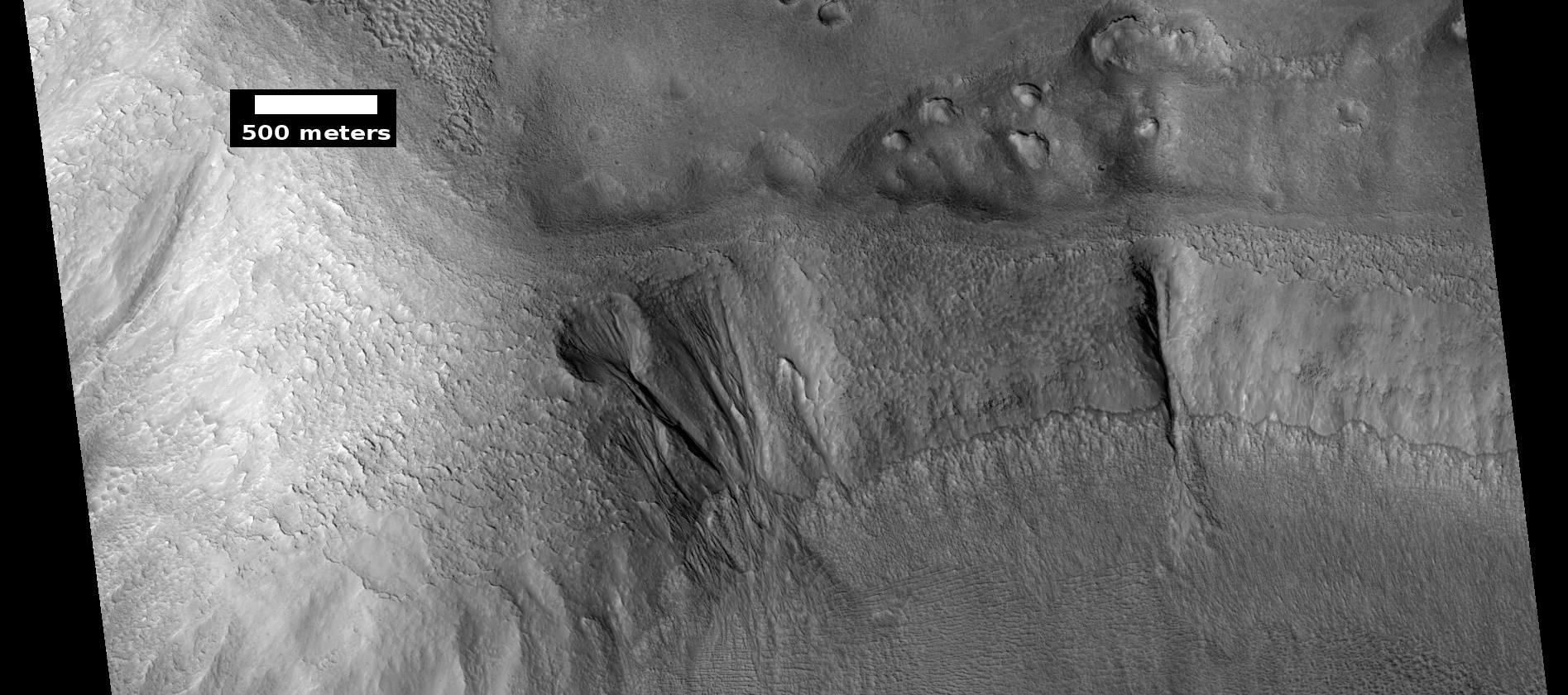
Gullies on wall of mesa, as seen by HiRISE under HiWish program

== Linear ridge networks ==
Linear ridge networks are found in various places on Mars in and around craters. These features have also been called "polygonal ridge networks," "boxwork ridges", and "reticulate ridges." Ridges often appear as mostly straight segments that intersect in a lattice-like manner. They are hundreds of meters long, tens of meters high, and several meters wide. It is thought that impacts created fractures in the surface, these fractures later acted as channels for fluids. Fluids cemented the structures. With the passage of time, surrounding material was eroded away, thereby leaving hard ridges behind.

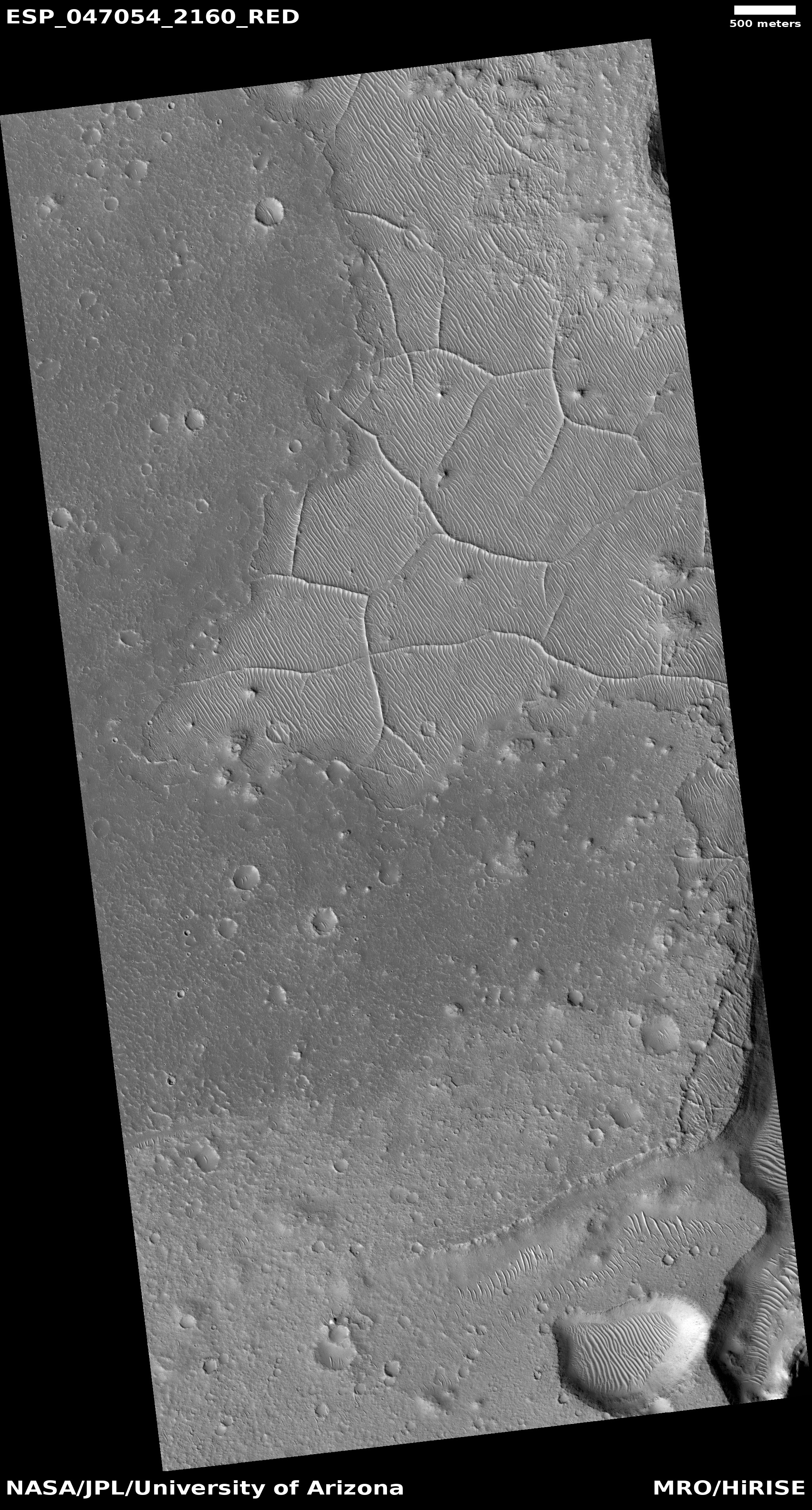
Wide view of ridge network, as seen by HiRISE under HiWish program

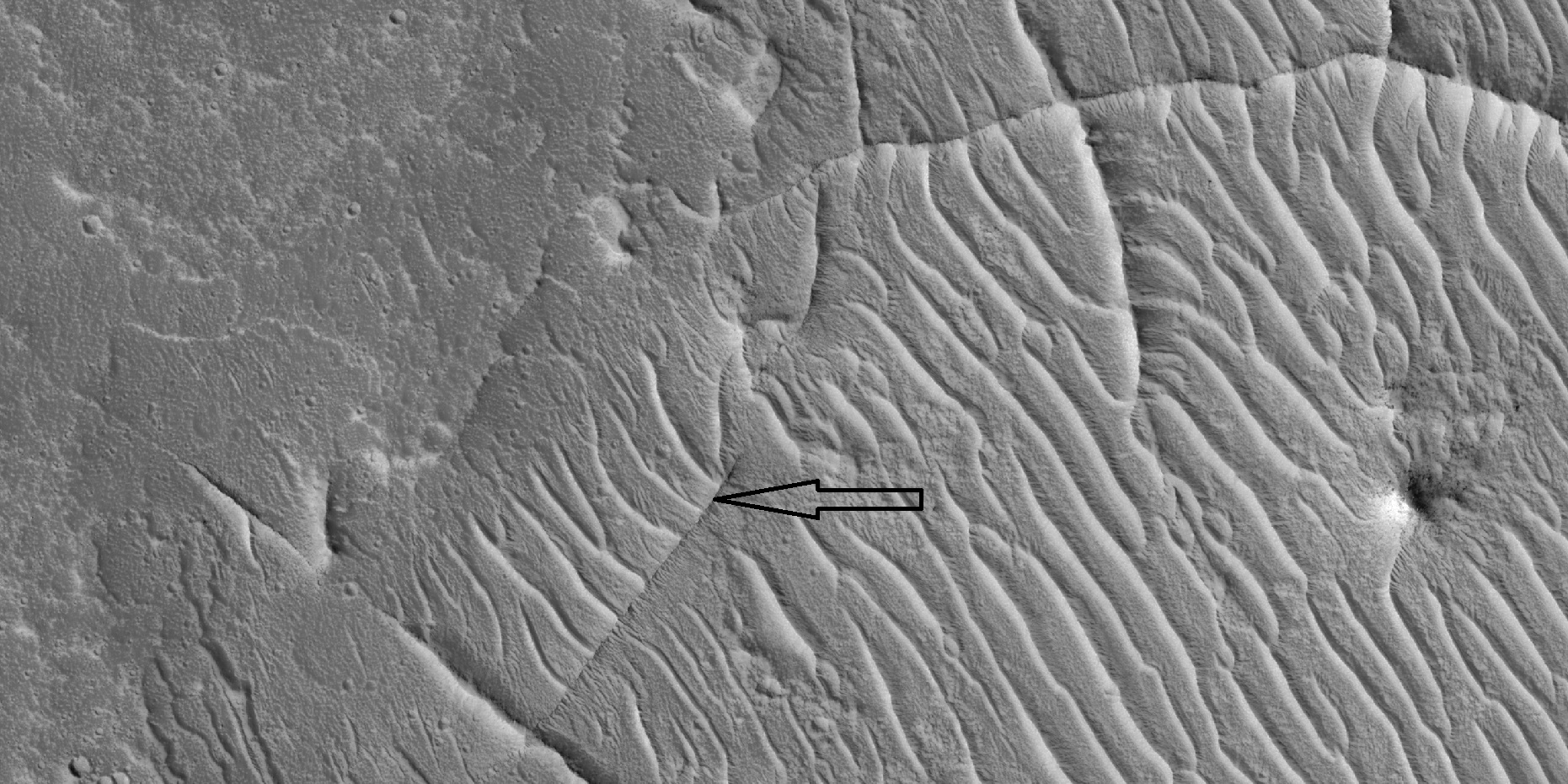
Close view of ridge networks, as seen by HiRISE under HiWish program Arrow points to small, straight ridge.

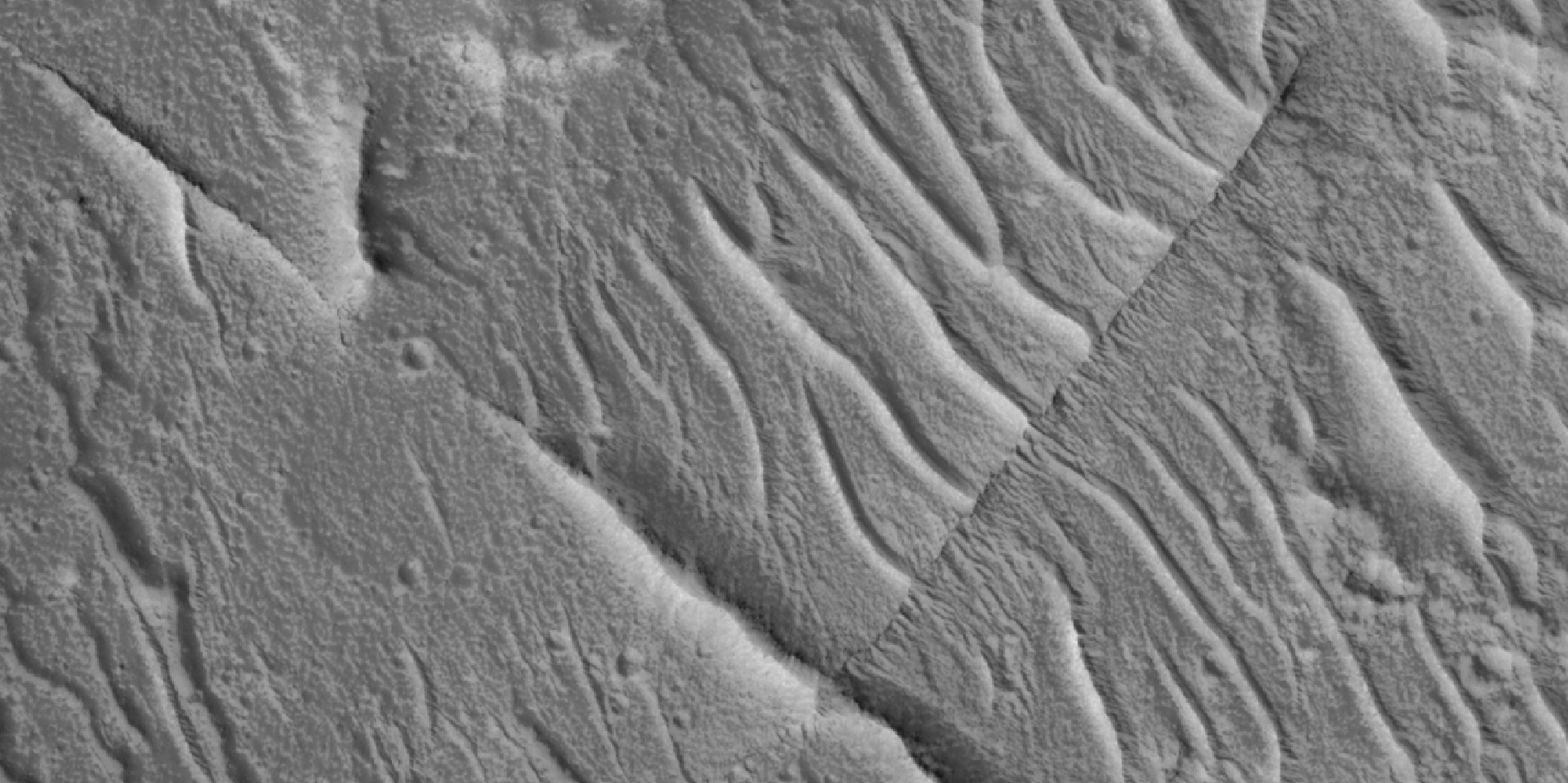
Close view of small and large ridges, as seen by HiRISE under HiWish program

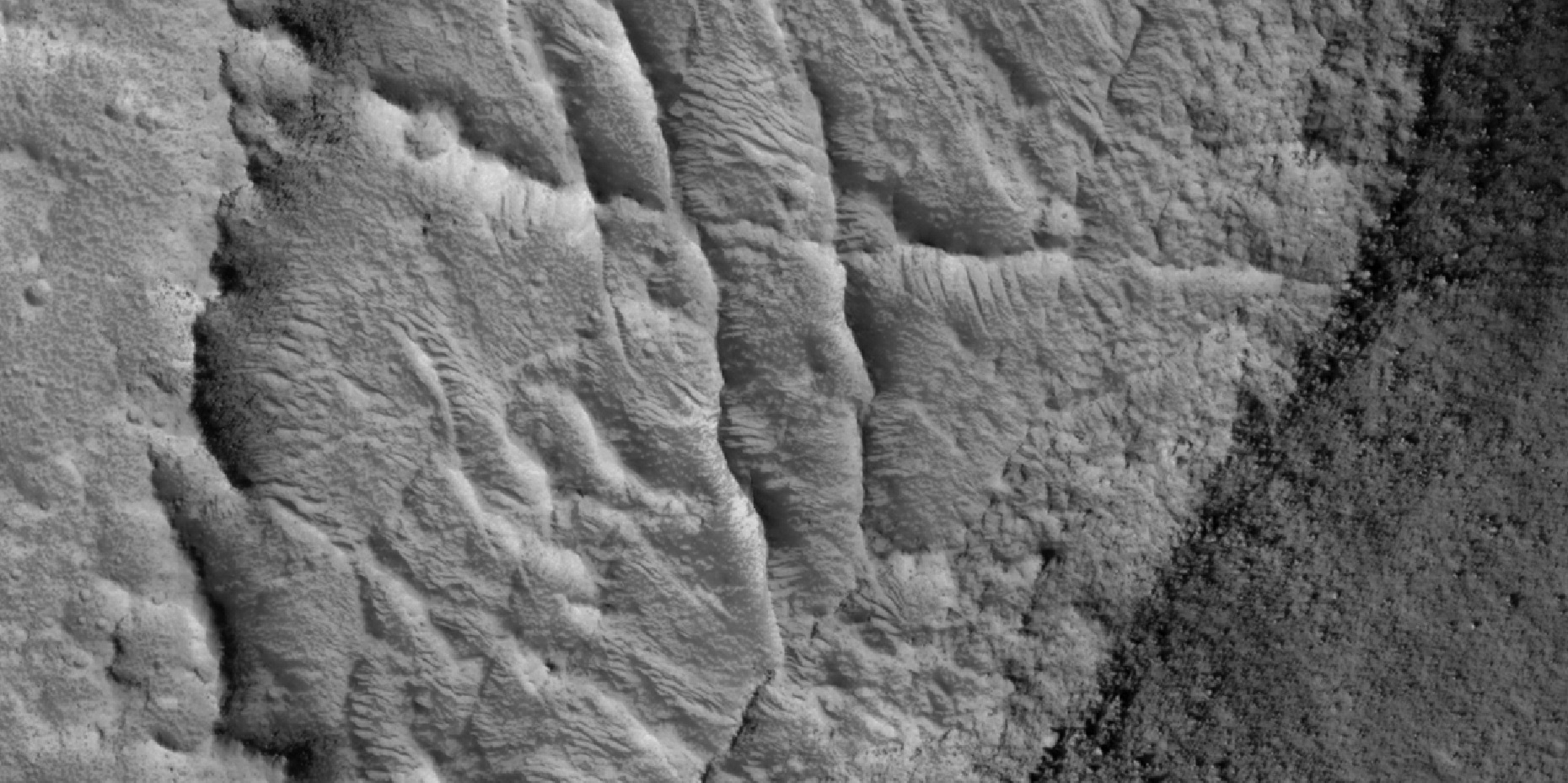
Close view of small and large ridges, as seen by HiRISE under HiWish program

== Pits and troughs ==
Pits and troughs are common on Mars. Large troughs (long narrow depressions) are called fossae in the geographical language used for Mars. This term is derived from Latin; therefore fossa is singular and fossae are plural. Several mechanisms can form them. Fossae can form when the crust is stretched until it breaks. The stretching can be due to the large weight of a nearby volcano. Fossae/pit craters are common near volcanoes in the Tharsis and Elysium system of volcanoes. Studies have found that on Mars a fault may be as deep as 5 km, that is the break in the rock goes down to 5 km. Moreover, the crack or fault sometimes widens or dilates. This widening causes a void to form with a relatively high volume. When surface material slides into the void, a pit crater or a pit crater chain forms. On Mars, individual pit craters can join to form chains or even to form troughs that are sometimes scalloped.

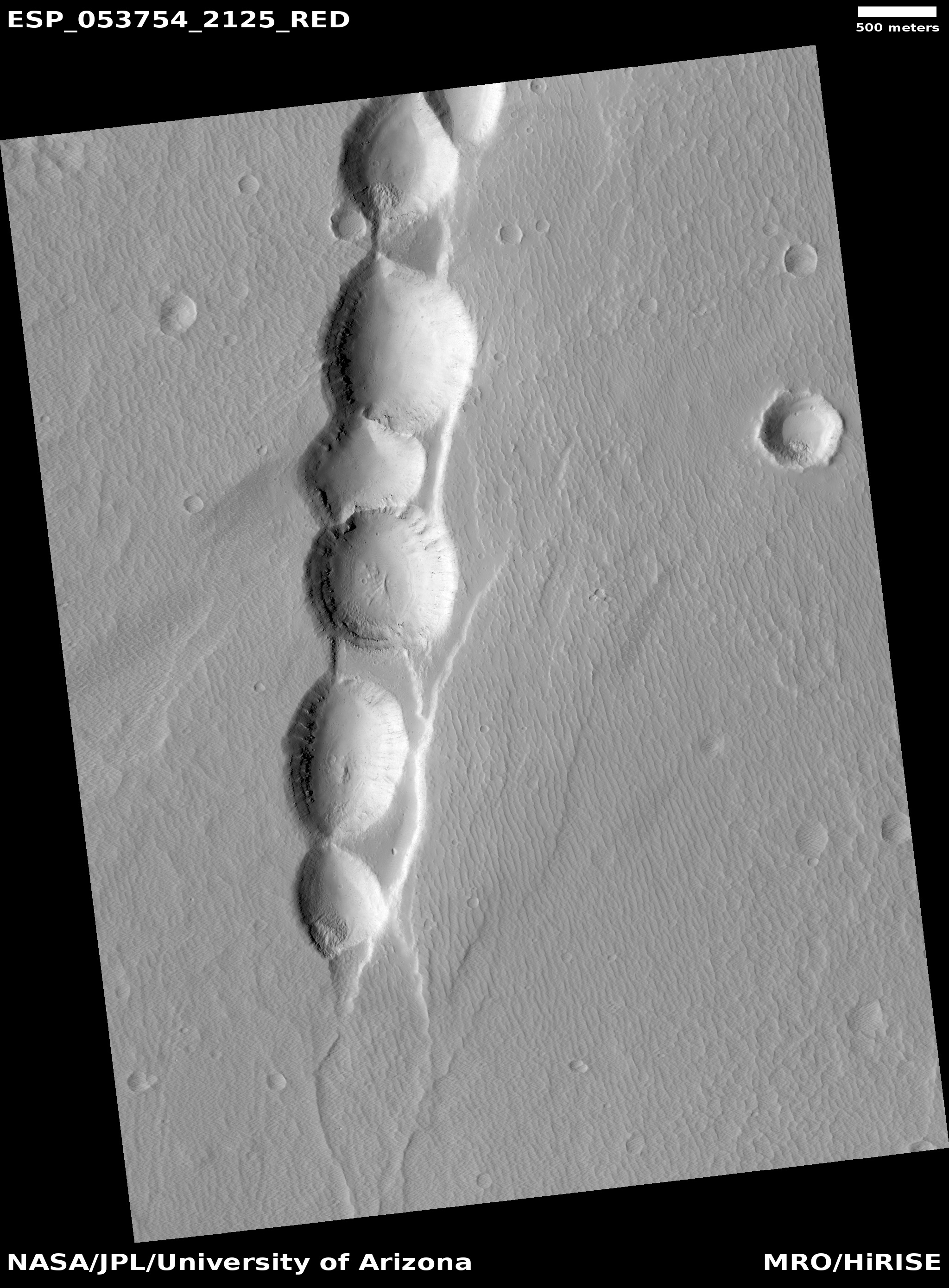
Line of pits, as seen by HiRISE under HiWish program Fossae often seem to start with a line of pits.

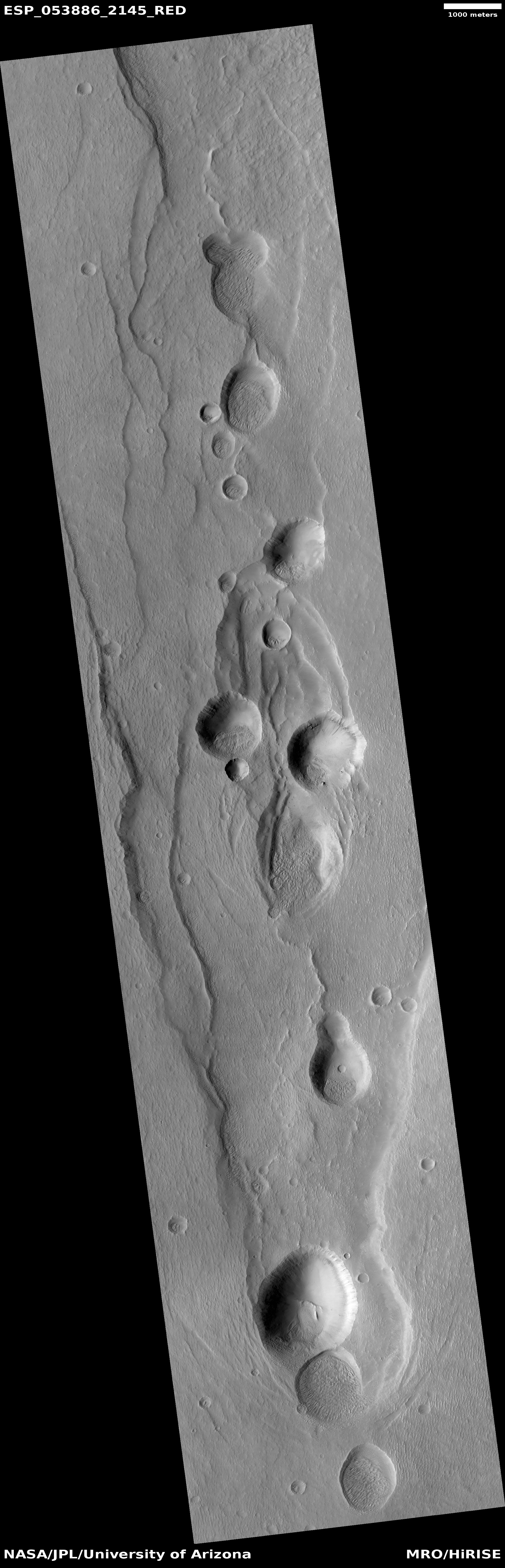
Pits in shallow trough, as seen by HiRISE under HiWish program

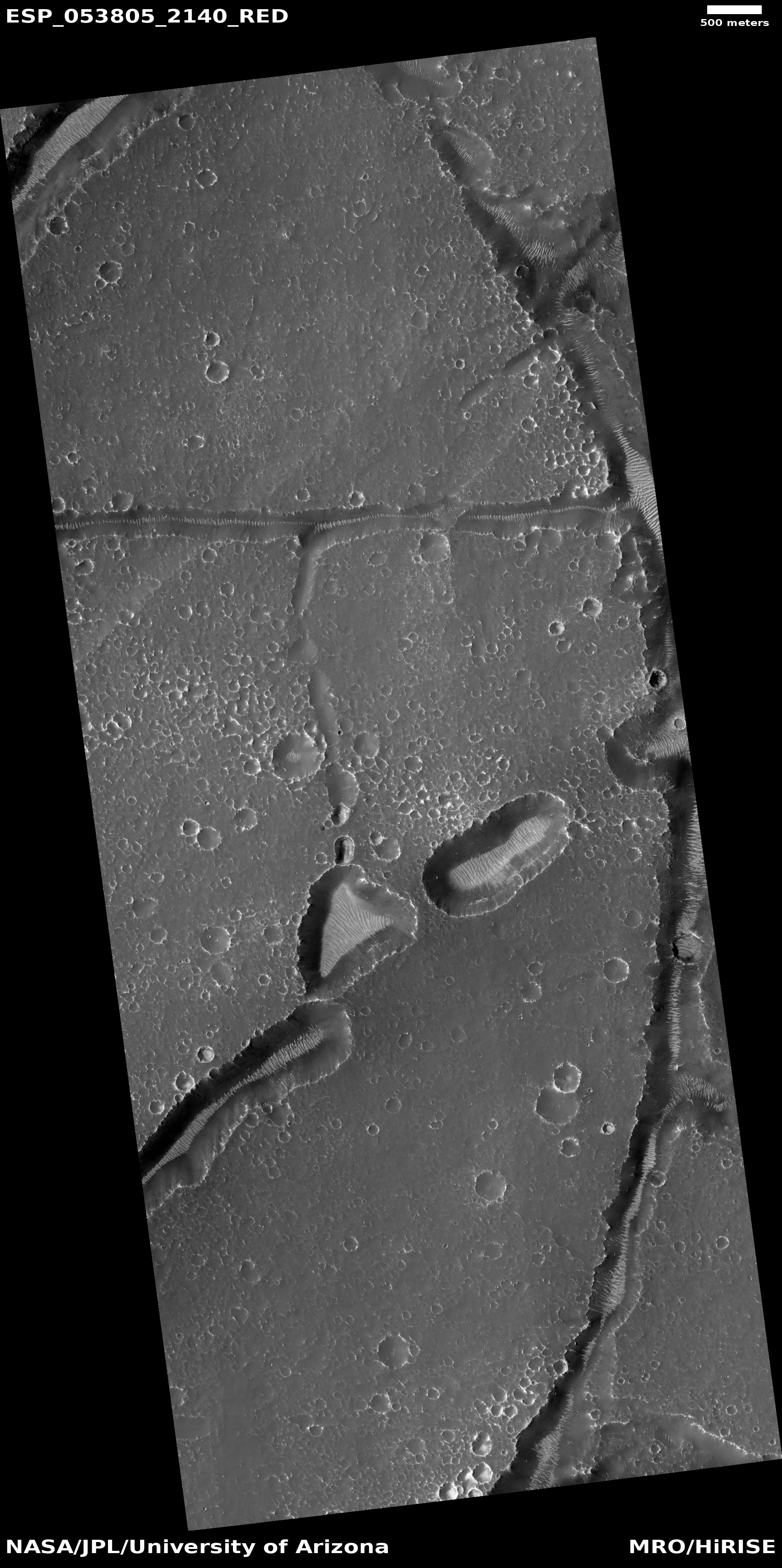
Troughs (Fossae), as seen by HiRISE under HiWish program

== Other images from Tempe Terra ==
The pictures below are probably formed from ice. The Martian surface displays many differed types of holes, pits, depressions, and hollows that are believed to have been caused by large amounts of ice disappearing from the ground. When the ice leaves, the ground collapses. Because of the thin atmosphere on the planet, the ice sublimates—goes directly from a solid phase to a gas phase. Dry ice does that on the Earth. Eskers form when a stream runs under a glacier and deposits material that is left behind when the glacier disappears.

Tempe Terra as seen in MOLA colorized image. Red areas show highest elevations; blue, lowest. Acidalia Planitia is the blue area at extreme right. The immense outflow channels of Kasei Valles is in the lower right.

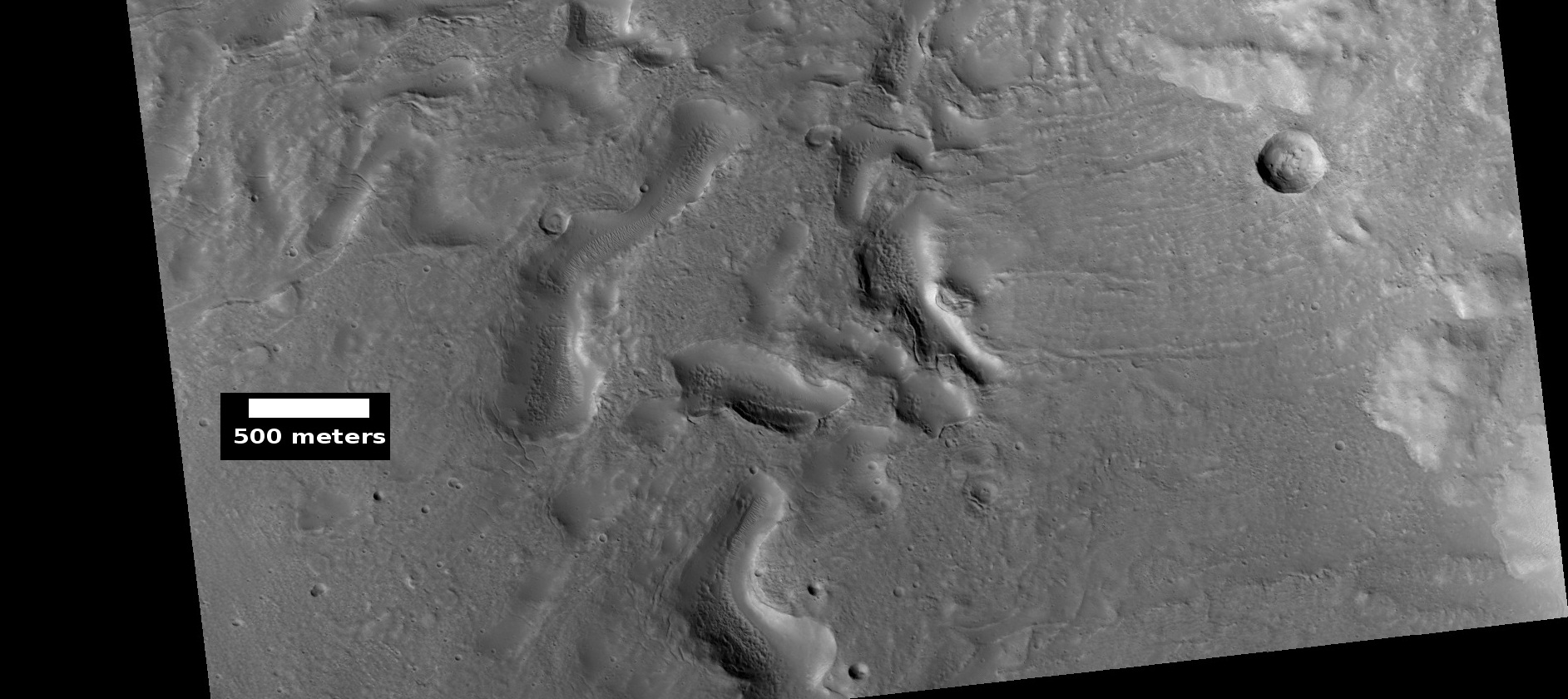
Hollows formed by erosion on floor of crater, as seen by HiRISE under HiWish program

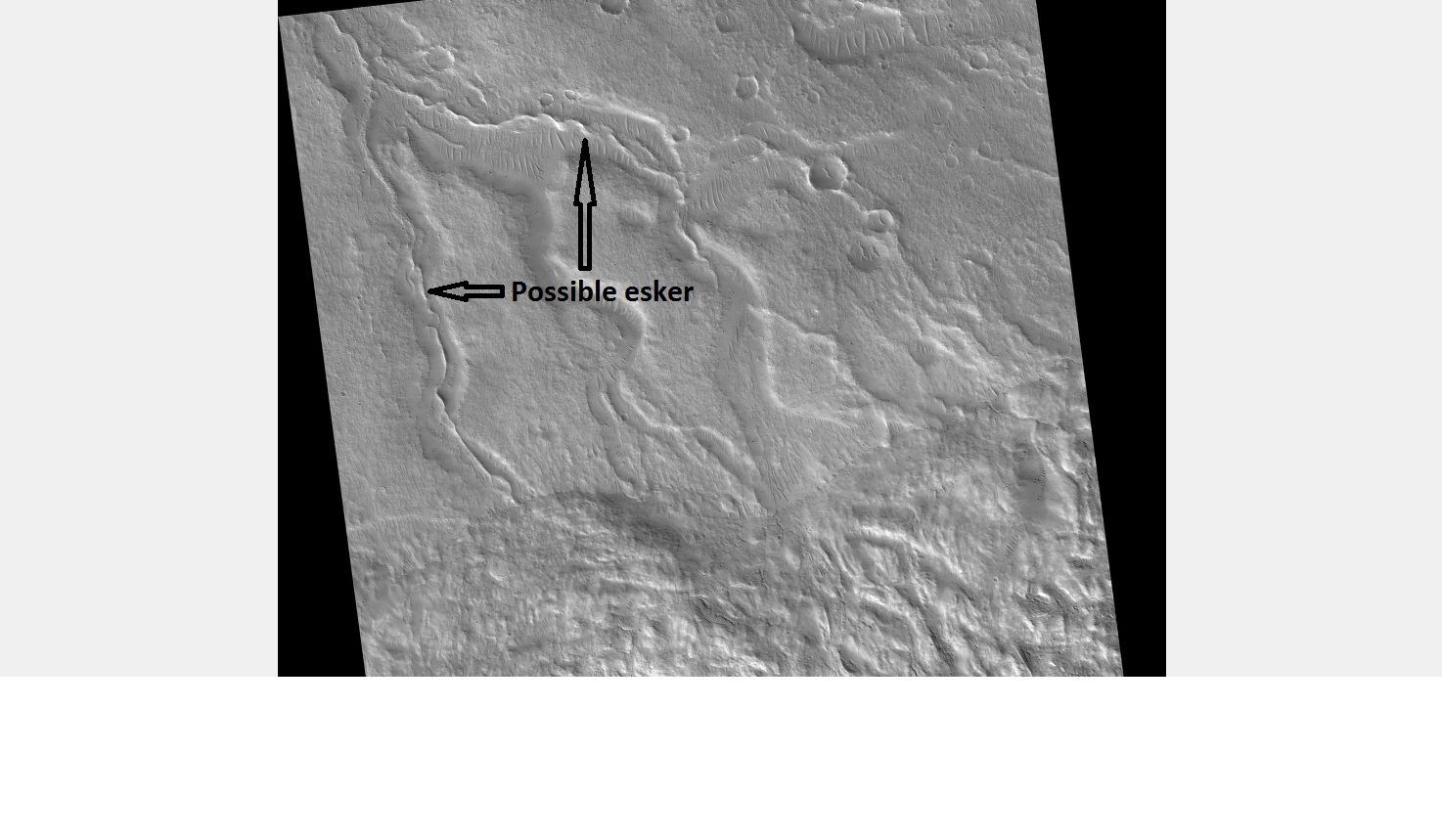
Esker, as seen by HiRISE under the HiWish program.

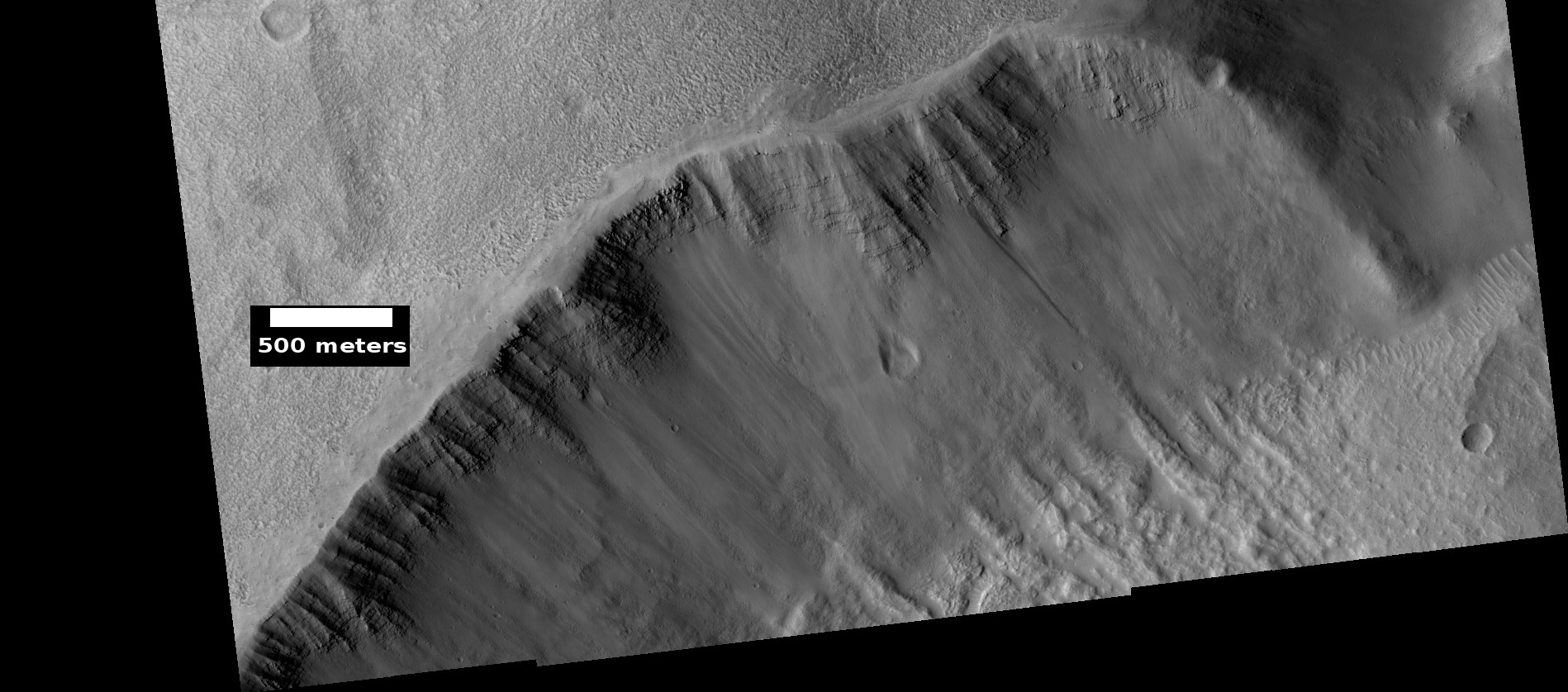
Layers, as seen by HiRISE under HiWish program Location is Tempe Terra in Arcadia quadrangle.

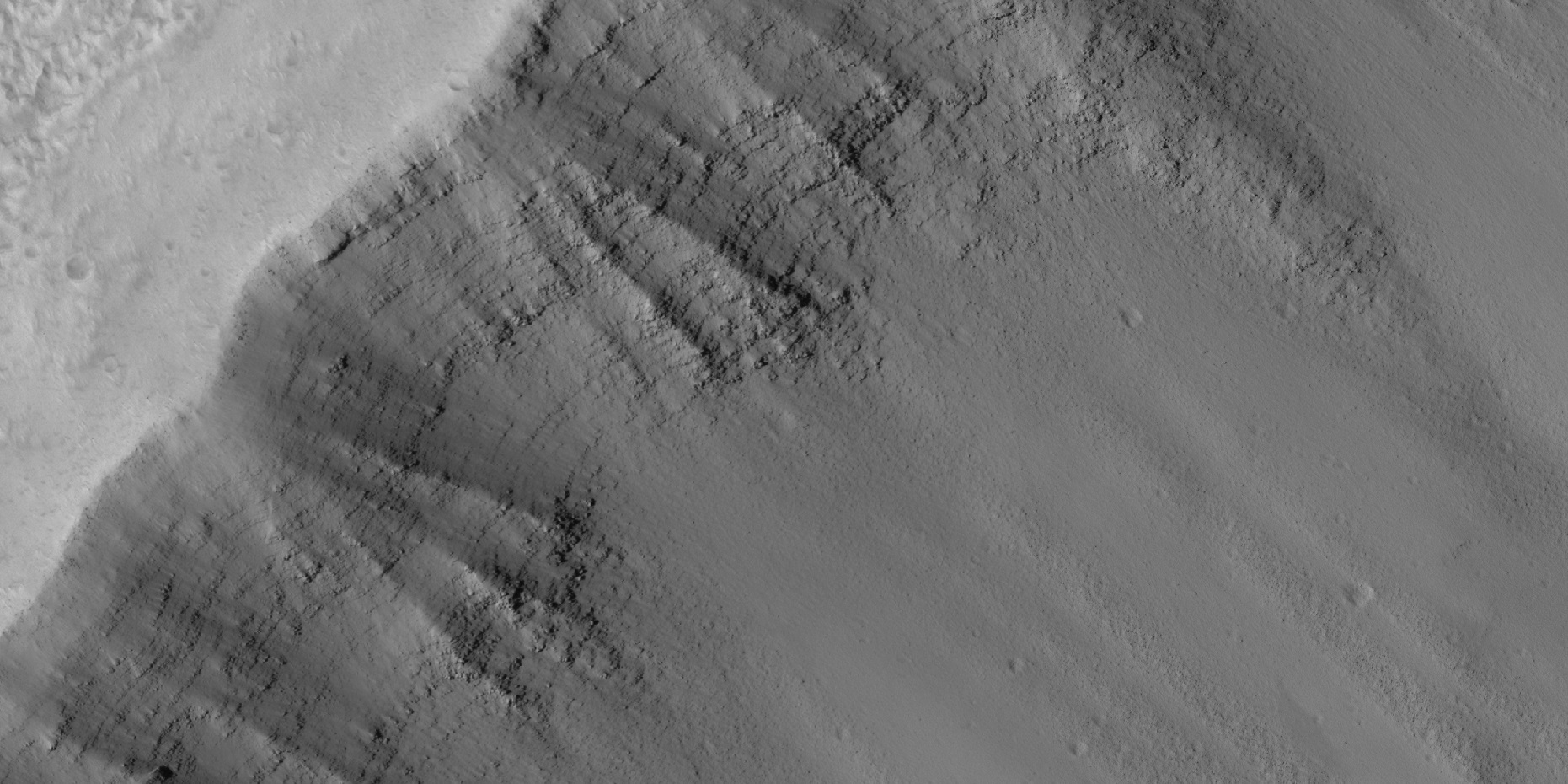
Layers, as seen by HiRISE under HiWish program Location is Tempe Terra Note: this is an enlargement of the previous image.

== See also ==
- Climate on Mars
- Glaciers
- Glaciers on Mars
- Martian Gullies
- Water on Mars
