= Terra Alta =

Terra Alta may refer to:

- Terra Alta (comarca)
- Terra Alta, West Virginia
- Terra Alta (DO)
- Terra Alta Apartments
- Terra Alta Bank
- Terra Alta (TV series)
