= Terra =

Terra oftens refer to:

- Terra (mythology), primeval Roman goddess
- Earth, in Latin, and as an alternate name in English

Terra may also refer to:

== Arts and media ==
=== Fictional characters ===
- Terra, a playable Goddess in Smite as a Roman Guardian
- Terra (Kingdom Hearts), a character from the Kingdom Hearts video game series
- Terra (character), the name of three characters in DC Comics
- Terra, a character from the Philippine fantasy drama series Encantadia Chronicles: Sang'gre
- Terra, a character from the video game Mega Man V
- Terra Branford, a female character from Final Fantasy VI
- Terra Grayson, a character from Invincible

=== Books ===
- Terra (German science fiction), a science fiction series published by Arthur Moewig Verlag, Munich
- The Terra Trilogy, a series of novels by Mitch Benn, consisting of Terra (2013), Terra's World (2014) and Terra's War (2021)
- Terra Nostra (novel) (Our Earth), a 1975 historical novel on Hispanic history by Mexican author Carlos Fuentes

=== Film and television ===
- Terra Film, German film company
- La Terra (film), 2006 Italian film
- Battle for Terra, a 2007 science fiction animated film originally screened as Terra
- Terra, in the anime RahXephon

=== Games ===
- Terra (video game), 1996
- Terra, a fictional universe in Final Fantasy IX
- Terra, a fictional planet in Crash Nitro Kart (2003)

=== Music ===
- Terra (band), a Japanese band
- Terra (Cronian album)
- Terra (Mariza album)
- Terra (Jenni Vartiainen album)
- TeRra (Live), an album by TeRra Han
- La Terra (album), by Aktuala
- "Terra", song by Geordie Greep from the 2024 album The New Sound

== Business and brands ==
- Terra (proposed currency), proposed global currency
- Terra (blockchain), on which the TerraUSD and Luna cryptocurrencies are built
- Terra Chips, a food brand owned by Hain Celestial Group
- Terra-Gruppen, Norwegian savings banks
- Terra (company), Spanish multinational media and internet company
- Nissan Terra, a sport utility vehicle manufactured by Nissan
- SEAT Terra, a van variant of the SEAT Marbella
- Scout Terra, an electric pick-up truck manufactured by Scout Motors

== Geography ==
=== Terminology ===
- Terrestrial (disambiguation), things related to land or the planet Earth
- Terra Australis (southern land), hypothetical continent appearing on maps from the 15th to the 18th century
- Terra incognita, unknown land, for regions that have not been mapped or documented
- Terra nullius, land belonging to no one, nobody's land, empty or desolate land
- Terra preta ("black earth"), a type of dark, fertile anthropogenic soil found in the Amazon Basin
- Terrae, extensive land masses found on various solar system bodies

=== Places ===
==== Earth ====
- Terra, Cyprus, a village in the Paphos District of Cyprus
- Terra Alta, West Virginia, a former coal town in Preston County

==== Space ====
- List of terrae on Mars
- List of terrae on Venus
- Terra, a highland on the Moon (Luna)

== Biology ==
- Terra (butterfly), genus
- TERRA (biology), TElomeric Repeat-containing RNA: RNA resulting from telomere transcription

== People ==
=== Given name ===
- Han Terra (born 1981), South Korean musician and inventor
- Terra Deva (born 1976), American actress, singer-songwriter, dancer, and former Mickey Mouse Club member
- Terra Findlay (born 1990), Canadian ice dancer
- Terra Hazelton, Canadian broadcaster, jazz musician, and actress
- Terra Jolé (born 1980), reality television personality
- Terra Lawson-Remer (born 1978), American politician, economist, and professor
- Terra Lightfoot (born 1986), Canadian musician and singer-songwriter
- Terra Naomi (born 1974), American musician and singer-songwriter
- Terra Ryzing, one of the names given to professional wrestler Triple H
- Terra Wellington, American actress
- Terra Ziporyn (born 1958), American writer and novelist

=== Surname ===
Terra (Earth or land in Italian and Portuguese languages) is a Portuguese or Italian surname. Notable people with the surname include:

- Daniel J. Terra (1911–1996), scientist, businessman, and art collector
- Gabriel Terra (1873–1942), Uruguayan president
- Josse van Aertrycke (1451–1546), Flemish nobleman who settled in the Azores, Portugal, and had his name translated to "Jorge da Terra"
- Osmar Terra (born 1950) Brazilian politician and physician

== Other uses ==
- Terra (satellite), a multi-national NASA scientific research satellite

== See also ==
- Tellus (disambiguation)
- Tera (disambiguation)
- Terra Alta (disambiguation)
- Terra Nova (disambiguation)
- Terrain
- Terran (disambiguation)
- Territory
