= Clynotis archeyi =

Conservation status
- Naturally Uncommon (NZ TCS)

Scientific classification
- Kingdom: Animalia
- Phylum: Arthropoda
- Subphylum: Chelicerata
- Class: Arachnida
- Order: Araneae
- Infraorder: Araneomorphae
- Family: Salticidae
- Genus: Clynotis
- Species: C. archeyi

Binomial name
- Clynotis archeyi (Berland, 1931)

Synonyms
- Cosmophasis archeyi

Species of spider

Clynotis archeyi is a species of jumping spider that is endemic to New Zealand.

== Taxonomy ==
This species was described as Cosmophasis archeyi by Lucien Berland from male and female specimens.

== Distribution ==
This species is only known from the Auckland Islands in New Zealand.

== Conservation status ==
Under the New Zealand Threat Classification System, this species is listed as "Naturally Uncommon" with the qualifiers of "Island Endemic" and "One Location".
