= Battle of Tara =

The Battle of Tara may refer to following battles:

- Battle of Tara (Ireland), 980, at Hill of Tara, between Uí Néill and Kingdom of Dublin
- Battle of Tara (1150), at Tara river, between Grand Principality of Serbia and Byzantine Empire
- Battle of Tara Hill, between British forces and Irish rebels involved in the Irish Rebellion of 1798
