= Tera =

Tera or TERA may refer to:

== People ==
- Tera Hunter, American professor of history
- Tera Patrick, (born 1976), American pornographic actress
- Tera people, an ethnic group in Gombe State, Nigeria

== Places ==
- Téra, Niger
- Tera, Paphos, Cyprus
- Tera, Kutch, India
- Tera Fort, a fort in Kutch, Gujarat, India

== Computing ==
- TERA, a type of network connector
- Tera Computer Company, an American computer software and hardware manufacturer
- Sega TeraDrive
- TERA (video game), 2011

== Other uses ==
- tera-, a metric prefix denoting a factor of 10^{12}
- tERA (baseball statistic), a baseball statistic
- Tera language, a Chadic language spoken in north-Nigeria
- TERA rifle, Japanese special rifles developed for paratroopers
- Queen Tera, a fictional Egyptian queen in Bram Stoker's novel The Jewel of Seven Stars
- RS Tera, an international racing class of sailing boats
- Topfree Equal Rights Association (TERA), a women's advocacy group
- Volkswagen Tera, a subcompact crossover SUV
- Tera (EP), an EP by Wolf Howl Harmony
- The Tera Type in Pokémon Scarlet and Violet

== See also ==
- Terra (disambiguation)
- Terror (disambiguation)
- Thera (disambiguation)
