= Terra Alta Apartments =

Coordinates: 13.7033°N 89.2524°W

Residential Condominium Building Terra Alta is a residential complex located in San Salvador, El Salvador. It is an Archer Group project designed by Salvadoran architect Roberto Antonio Rivera.

The complex consists of 20 floors and 83 apartments, and has a height of 90 m (300 ft). It is part of the construction of several apartment buildings in the area of Colonia Escalon, in response to high housing demand. The design is complemented by semi-circular structures at the ends, covered with green reinforced glass.

It is the fourth tallest building in El Salvador, just below the Torre El Pedregal (110.3 m), the World Trade Center San Salvador 99 m (325 ft) and the Tower Alisios 115 92 m (302 ft).
