= Tara, Zambia =

Village in Zambia

Coordinates: 16°57′S 26°47′E

Tara is a small village, about 25 km south west of Choma, in the Southern Province of Zambia. It is situated along the main road from Livingstone to Lusaka. The main economic activity is farming with tobacco being the main cash crop.

== Geographical Location ==
The village is positioned at a latitude of approximately 16°56' South and a longitude of 26°47' East. This places it within the Choma District, characterized by a monsoon-influenced humid subtropical climate (Köppen climate classification Cwa).
