= List of terrae on Mars =

The following is a list of regions on Mars given the name Terra (pl. Terrae). Most cover large, rugged areas, often including outflow channels, cratering, and "chaos terrain". They may be contrasted with the Planitia (e.g., Amazonis Planitia) and Mare (e.g., Mare Erythraeum), smoother regions of differing albedo.

Name	Coordinates	Feature diameter (km)
Aonia Terra	62.0°S 100.0°E	3,372
Arabia Terra	23.0°N 355.0°E	6,000
Terra Cimmeria	35.0°S 215.0°E	5,400
Margaritifer Terra	5.0°S 25.0°E	2,049
Noachis Terra	45.0°S 350.0°E	4,800
Promethei Terra	58.0°S 260.0°E	3,300
Terra Sabaea	2.0°N 318.0°E	4,700
Terra Sirenum	40.0°S 150.0°E	3,900
Tempe Terra	40.0°N 71.0°E	2,753
Tyrrhena Terra	15.0°S 270.0°E	2,300
Xanthe Terra	3.0°N 48.0°E	2,465

== See also ==
- List of plains on Mars
- List of areas of chaos terrain on Mars
