= Tara Township, Minnesota =

Tara Township may refer to the following townships in the U.S. state of Minnesota:

- Tara Township, Swift County, Minnesota
- Tara Township, Traverse County, Minnesota
