= Tara (surname) =

Tara is the surname of the following notable people:

- Ismail Tara (1949–2022), Pakistani actor and comedian
- Şarık Tara (1930–2018), Turkish billionaire and former captain of industry
- Wassim Ben Tara (born 1996), Tunisian volleyball player
