= Tara (spider) =

Scientific classification
- Kingdom: Animalia
- Phylum: Arthropoda
- Subphylum: Chelicerata
- Class: Arachnida
- Order: Araneae
- Infraorder: Araneomorphae
- Family: Salticidae
- Subfamily: Salticinae
- Genus: Tara; Peckham & Peckham, 1886

Type species
- T. anomala (Keyserling, 1882)

Species
- T. anomala (Keyserling, 1882) – Australia (New South Wales); T. gratiosa (Rainbow, 1920) – Australia (Lord Howe Is.); T. parvula (Keyserling, 1883) – Australia (New South Wales)

Genus of spiders

Tara is a genus of Australian jumping spiders that was first described by George and Elizabeth Peckham in 1886. As of August 2019 it contains only three species, found only in New South Wales: T. anomala, T. gratiosa, and T. parvula.

== Genus ==
This genus is notable for its restricted distribution and small number of recognized species

- : Animalia
- : Arthropoda
- : Arachnida
- : Araneae
- : Salticidae
- : Tara

The genus Tara was first described in the late 19th and early 20th centuries, with the earliest species attributed to Keyserling in 1882.

== See also ==
- Thianitara
