= Hypanis Valles =

Geographic formation on Mars

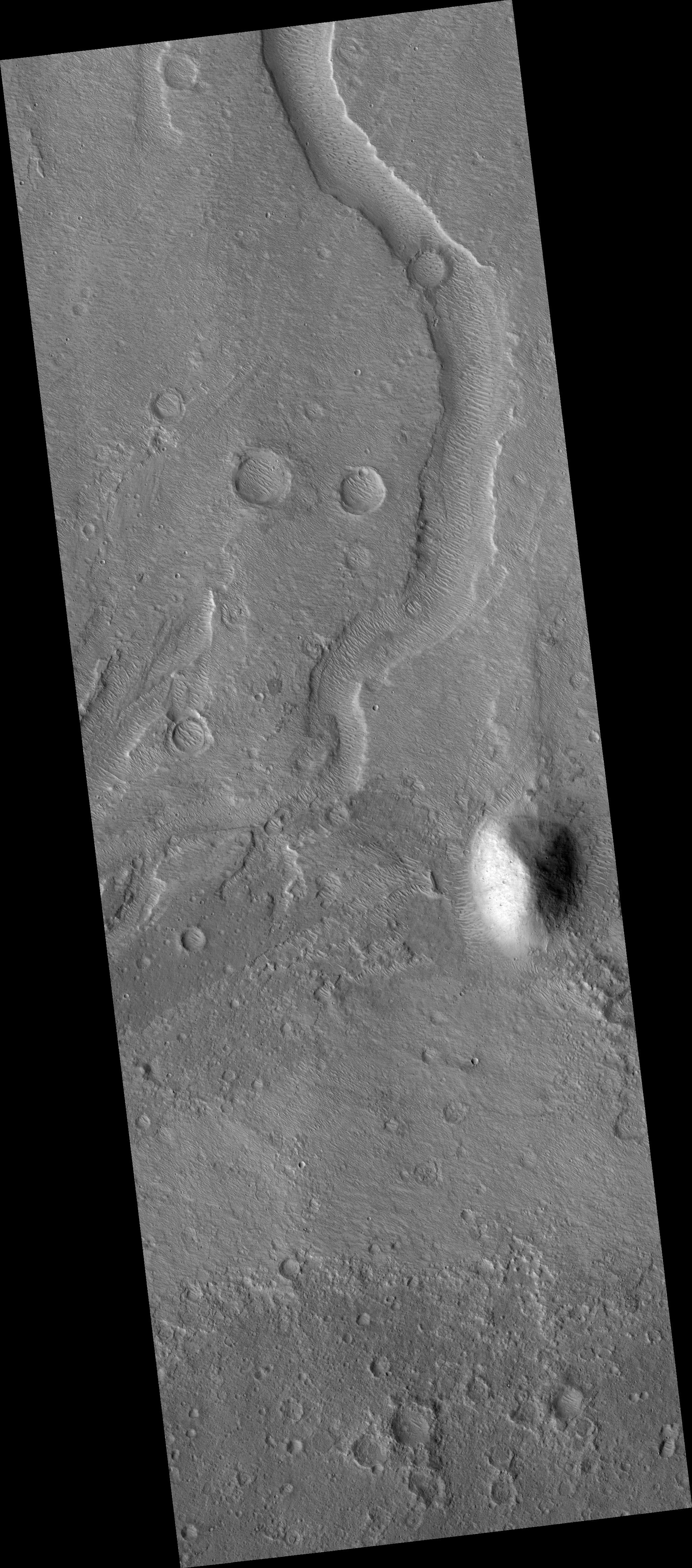
- Proposed (but rejected) Mars Science Laboratory landing site in the Hypanis Valles
- Coordinates: 9.6°N 46.7°W
- Length: 231.0 km
- Naming: Classical name for river in Scythia; present Kuban River in Russia.

The Hypanis Valles are a set of channels in a 270 km valley in Xanthe Terra on Mars at 11° N, 314° E, in the Lunae Palus quadrangle. They appear to have been carved by long-lived flowing water, and a significant deposit (interpreted by some to be a river delta) exists at their outlet into the lowlands.

The feature was named for a river in Scythia; present Kuban River in Russia.

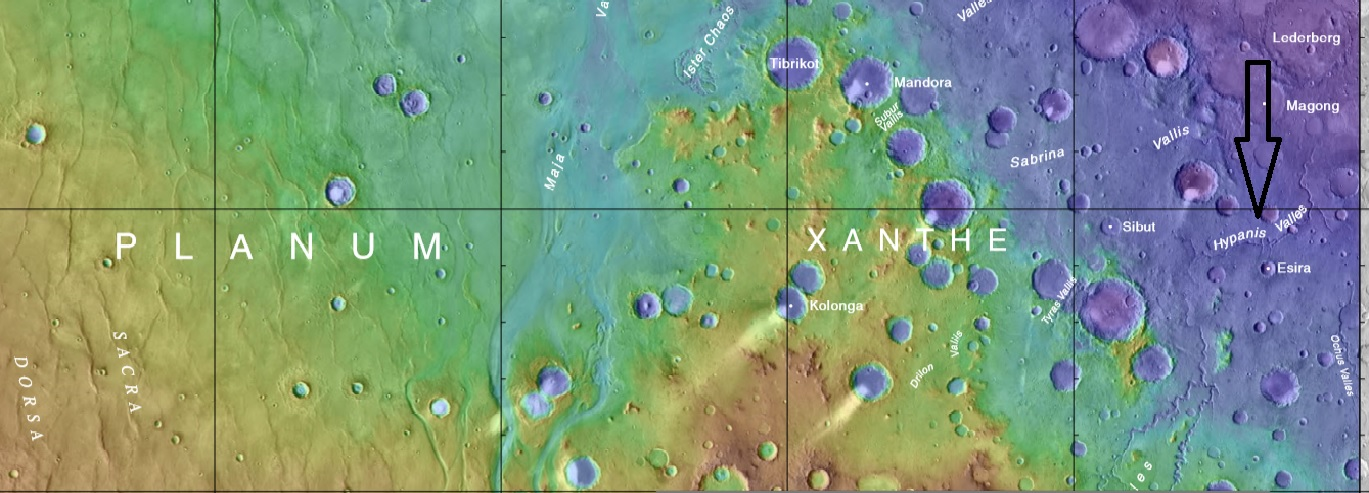
Map showing location of the Hypanis Valles (indicated with an arrow) and nearby features

Research described at a Planetary Conference in Texas in the spring of 2018 suggested that the Hypanis Valles fan complex is a delta with multiple channels and lobes, which formed at the margin of a large, standing body of water. That body of water was a northern ocean. This delta is at the dichotomy boundary between the northern lowlands and southern highlands near Chryse Planitia. It is the largest proposed delta system on Mars.

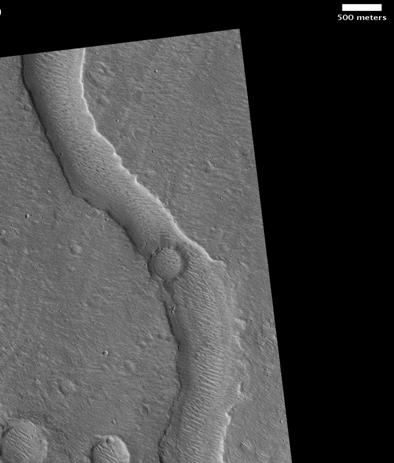
A location in the Hypanis Valles, as seen by HiRISE (scale bar is 500 m)

== Exploration ==
The Hypanis Valles system was one of the landing sites proposed for the Mars rover Curiosity of the Mars Science Laboratory mission, to assess the past habitability potential of that zone. However, it did not make the final cut.

This location was also one of the four semifinalist candidate landing sites for the ExoMars rover, now renamed the Rosalind Franklin rover mission, due to launch in mid- to late 2020s, though it was eventually eliminated from the running. The goal of ExoMars is search for signs of any past or present life on Mars. The proposal was for the rover to land on the distal deposits adjacent to the Hypanis delta and the nearby Sabrina delta. These deposits are likely to be composed of fine grained sediment, having been laid down in a low energy environment, where any potential biosignatures could be preserved.

== See also ==
- Geology of Mars
- HiRISE
- Lunae Palus quadrangle
- Outflow channels
- Vallis (planetary geology)
- Water on Mars
