= Xanthe Terra =

Terra on Mars

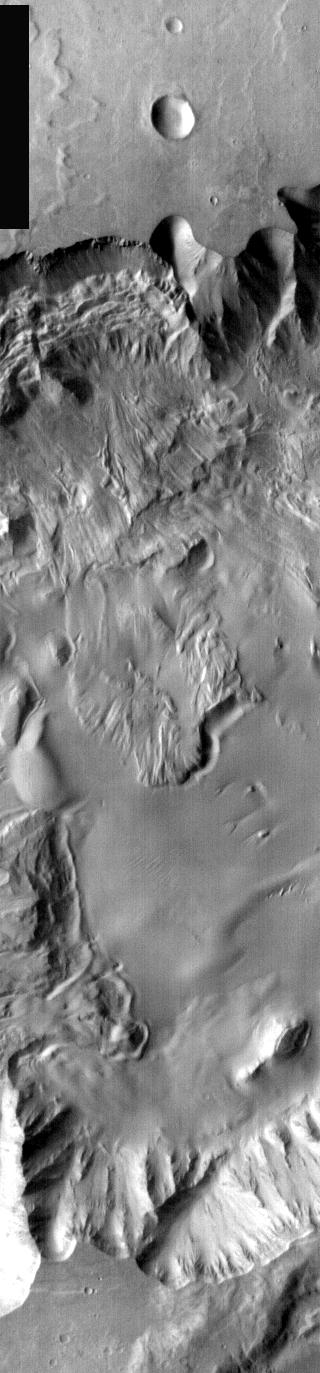
Landslide in Xanthe Terra

Xanthe Terra is a large area on Mars, centered just north of the Martian equator. Its coordinates are 3°N 312°E and its diameter is 1867.65 km. Its name means "golden-yellow land." It is in the Lunae Palus quadrangle, the Coprates quadrangle, the Margaritifer Sinus quadrangle, and the Oxia Palus quadrangle.

Ravi Vallis, Aromatum Chaos, Ophir, Ganges Chasma, Nanedi Valles, Shalbatana Vallis, Orson Welles Crater, Mutch Crater, and Da Vinci Crater are some major features in Xanthe Terra.

Images from Mars Express, Mars Global Surveyor, and the Mars Reconnaissance Orbiter have revealed ancient river valleys and deltas. The deltas show many thin layers just as deltas on Earth. Scientists speculate that features in Xanthe Terra show evidence of precipitation on early Mars.

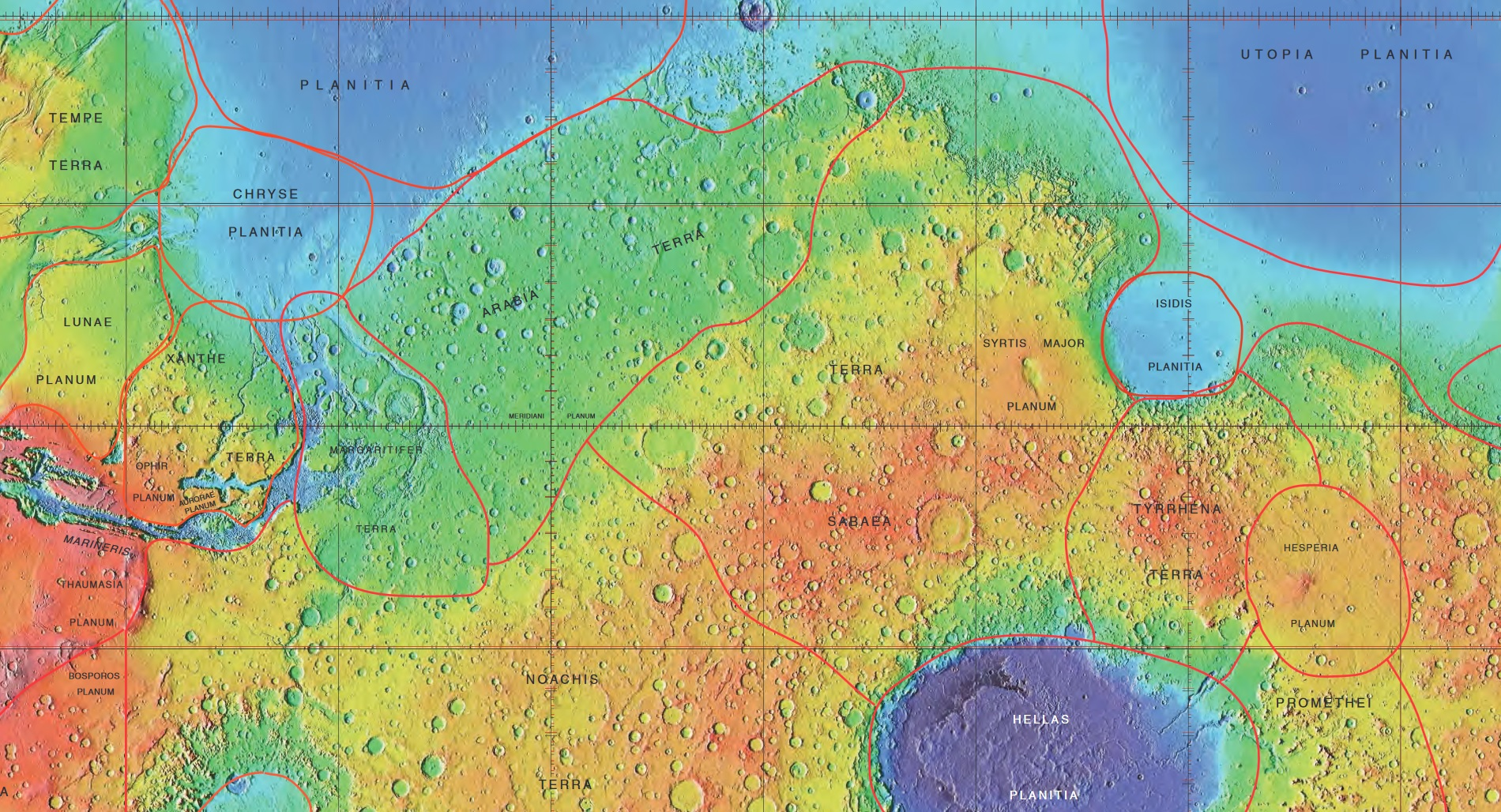
MOLA map showing boundaries of Xanthe Terra and other regions

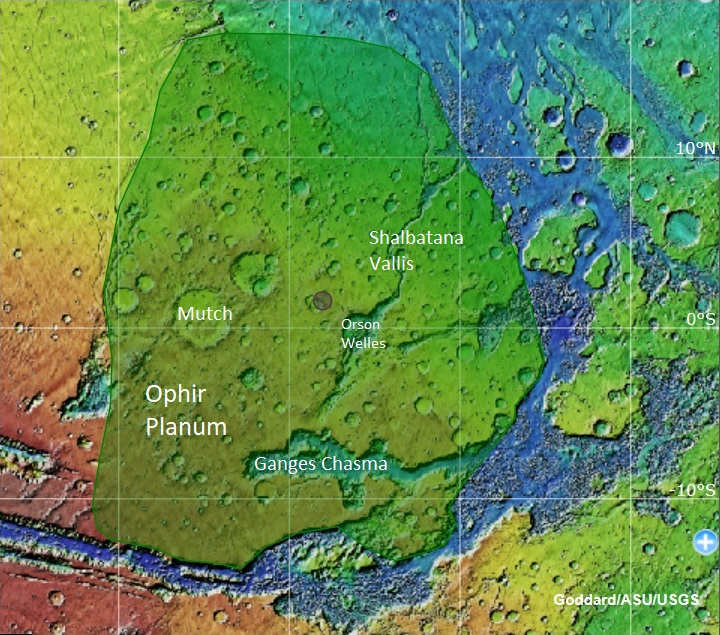
Map of Xanthe Terra with major features labeled
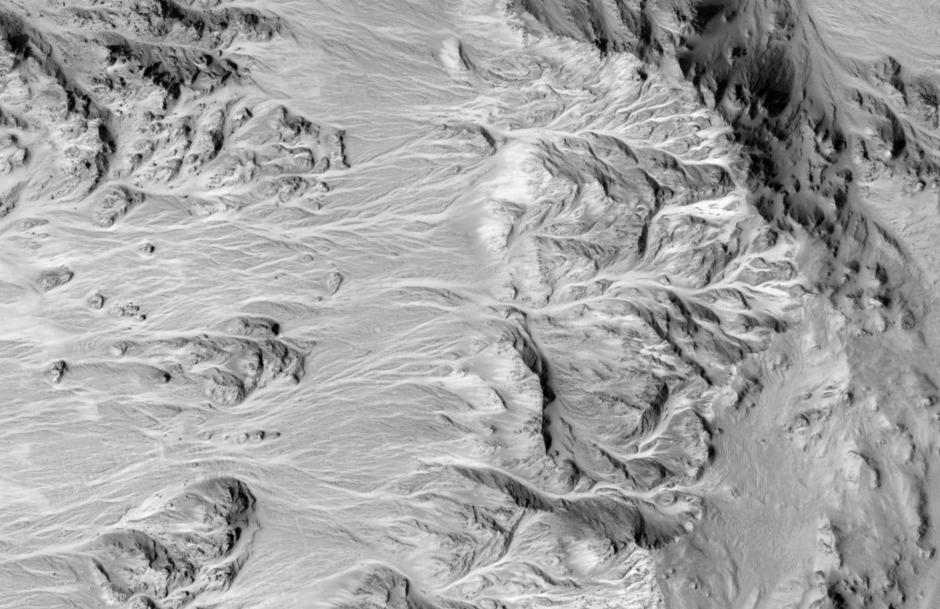
Alluvial Fans in Mojave Crater, as seen by HiRISE. High ground is on the right. Branched network of channels runs from higher ground (crater rim) to lower ground.
