= Nanedi Valles =

Valles on Mars

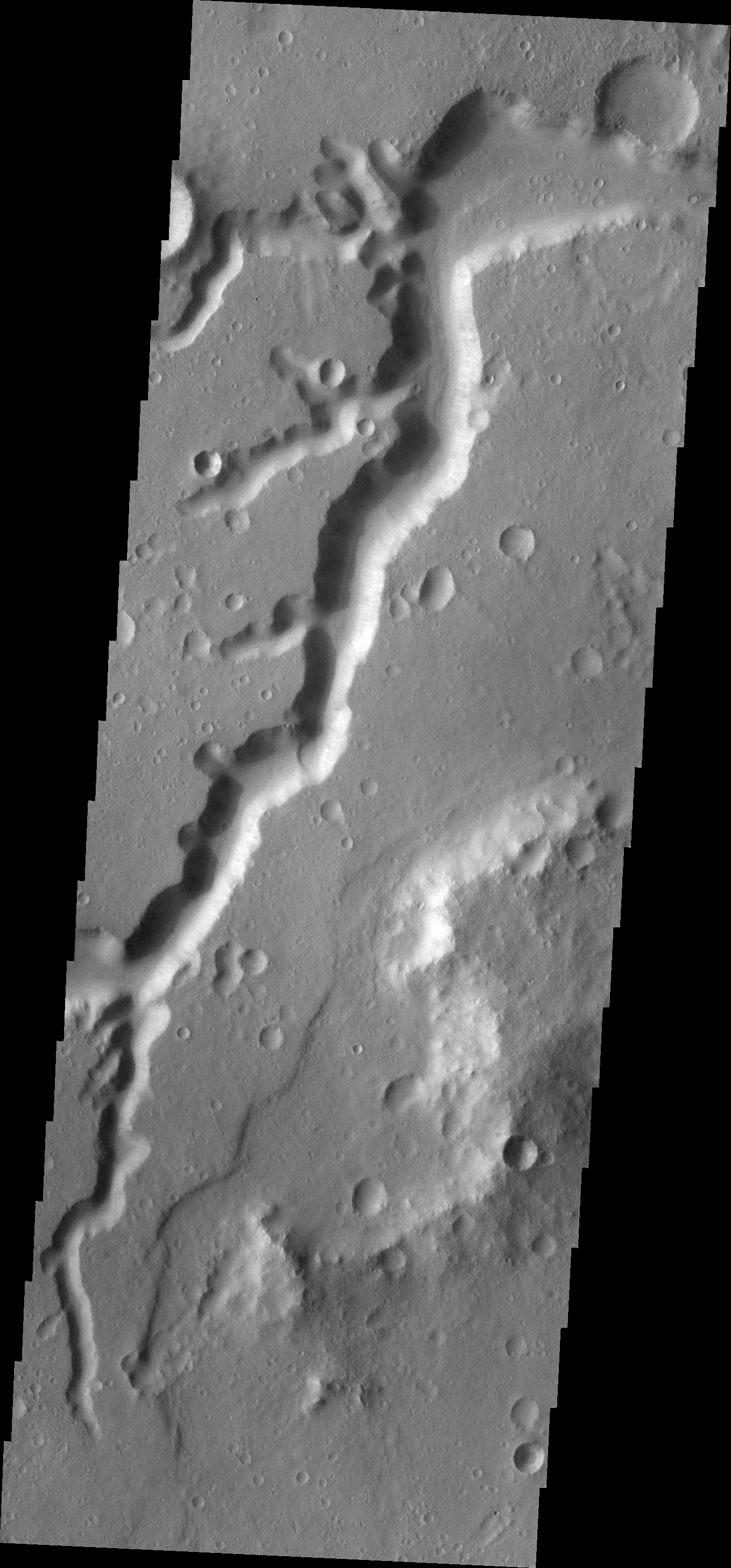
- The Nanedi Valleys, as seen by THEMIS (click on image to see more detail)
- Coordinates: 4.9°N 49.0°W

The Nanedi Valles are a set of channels in a large valley in the Lunae Palus quadrangle of Mars, located at 4.9° N and 49.0° W. They are 508 km long and were named for the word for "planet" in Sesotho, the national language of Lesotho, Africa.

The Nanedi Valles are located between Shalbatana Vallis and the upper Maja Valles. They are 4 km wide at their northern end. Their valley's shape is similar to that of Nirgal Vallis, being very sinuous and having only a few short branches.

Unusually for Martian valleys, the individual channel structures within the wider valley floors can occasionally be seen in this system.

== Gallery ==
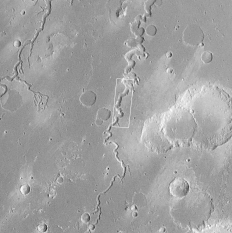
Wide view of the Nanedi Valles, as seen by Viking 1 Orbiter

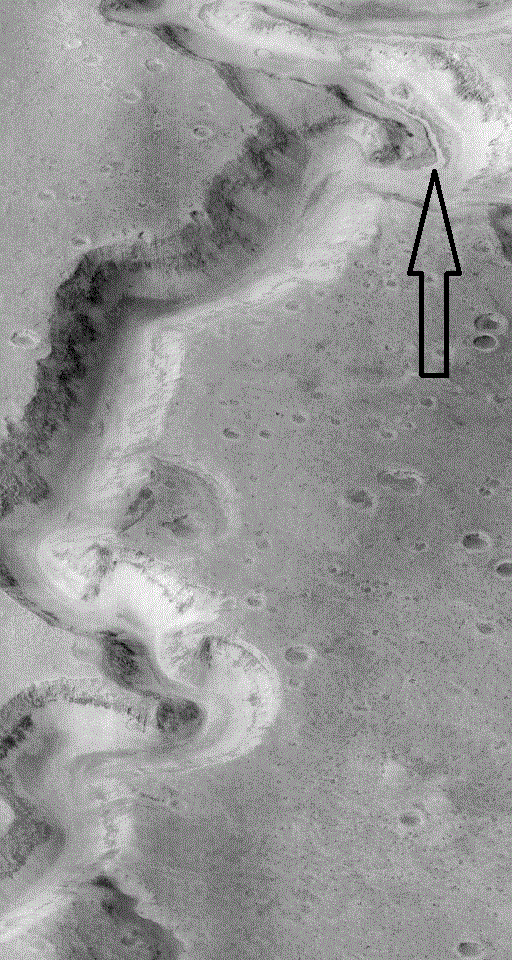
Close view of the Nanedi Valles, as seen by Mars Global Surveyor (enlargement of the previous image). Arrow points to a small channel that formed after the main valley.

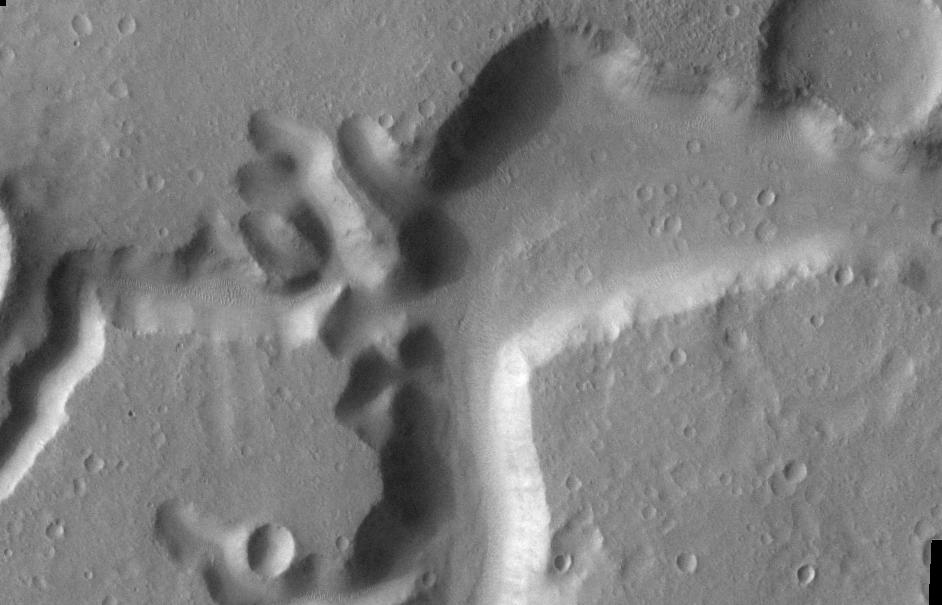
Close-up of the Nanedi Valles, as seen by THEMIS (click on image to see more detail)

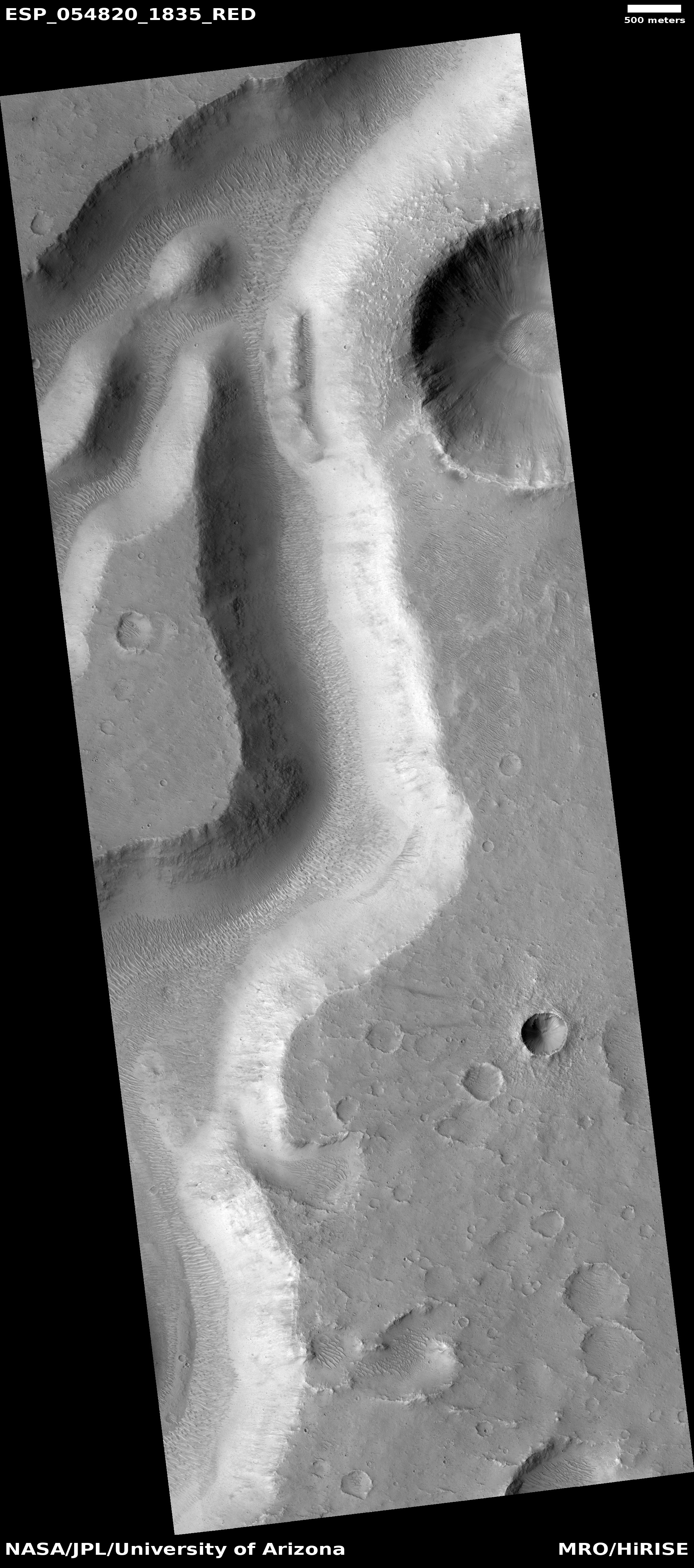
Section of the Nanedi Valles, as seen by HiRISE under the HiWish program

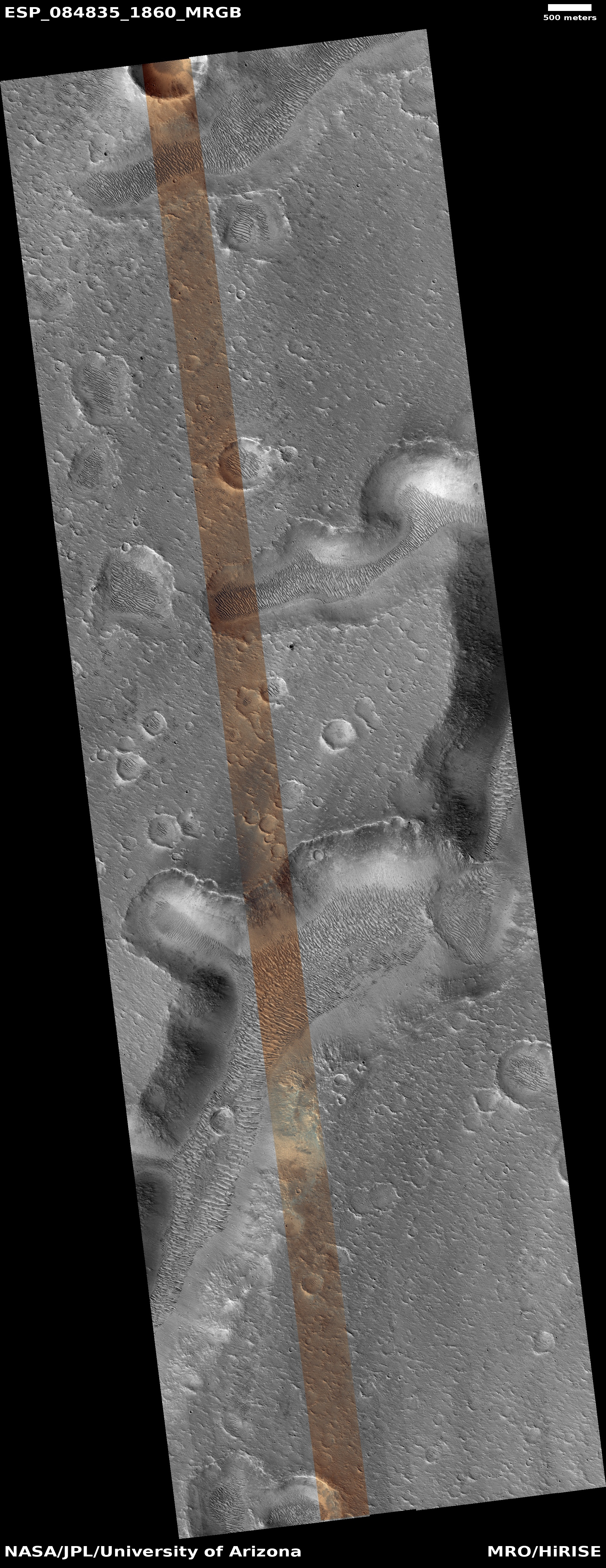
Portion of Nanedi Valles, as seen by HiRISE under the HiWish program Colored strip is about 1 Km across.

== See also ==
- Shalbatana Vallis
- Maja Valles
- Nirgal Vallis
- Lunae Palus quadrangle
