= Sacra Mensa =

Martian mesa

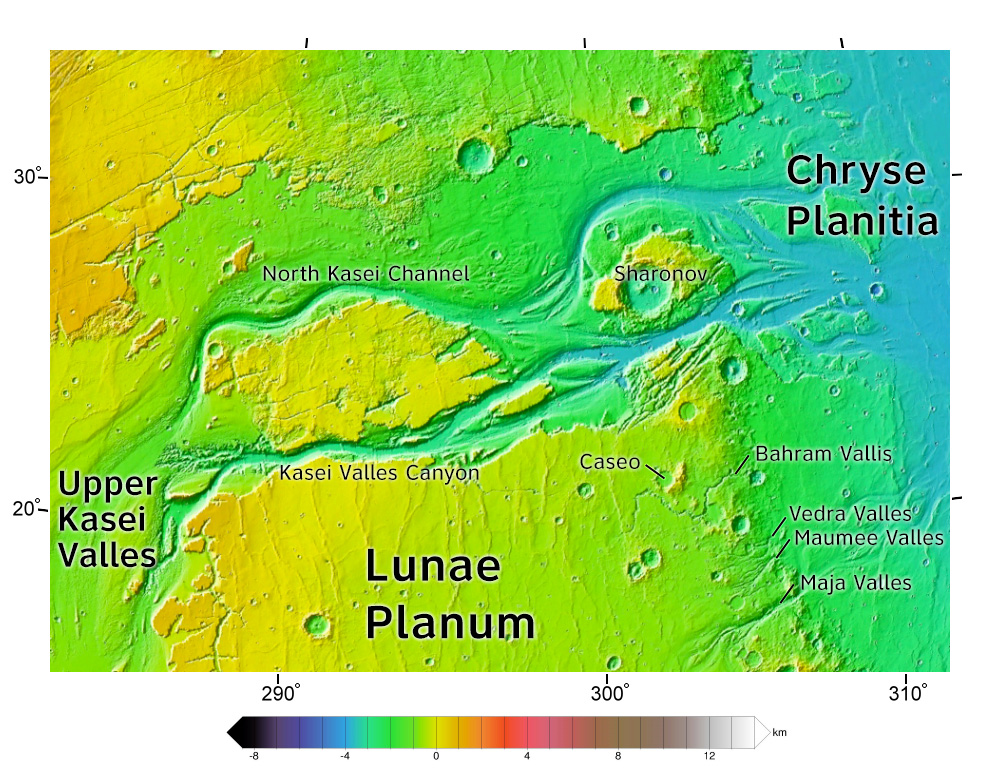
- Map of the northern Kasei Valles region. Map location is in Lunae Palus quadrangle. Sacra Mensa is the highland located between North Kasei Channel and Kasei Valles Canyon. Flow was from bottom left to right. Image is approx. 1600 km across, and the channel system extends another 1200 km south of this image to Echus Chasma.
- Feature type: Mensa
- Coordinates: 24.6°N 66.5°W

Sacra Mensa is a mensa in the Lunae Palus quadrangle of Mars, located between the northern and southern channels of the Kasei Valles. Located roughly 66.5° west longitude and 24.6° north latitude, the mesa is a highland between two deep outflow valleys. The mesa is located just west of the Sharonov impact crater.
