= Chryse Alien =

Crater on Mars

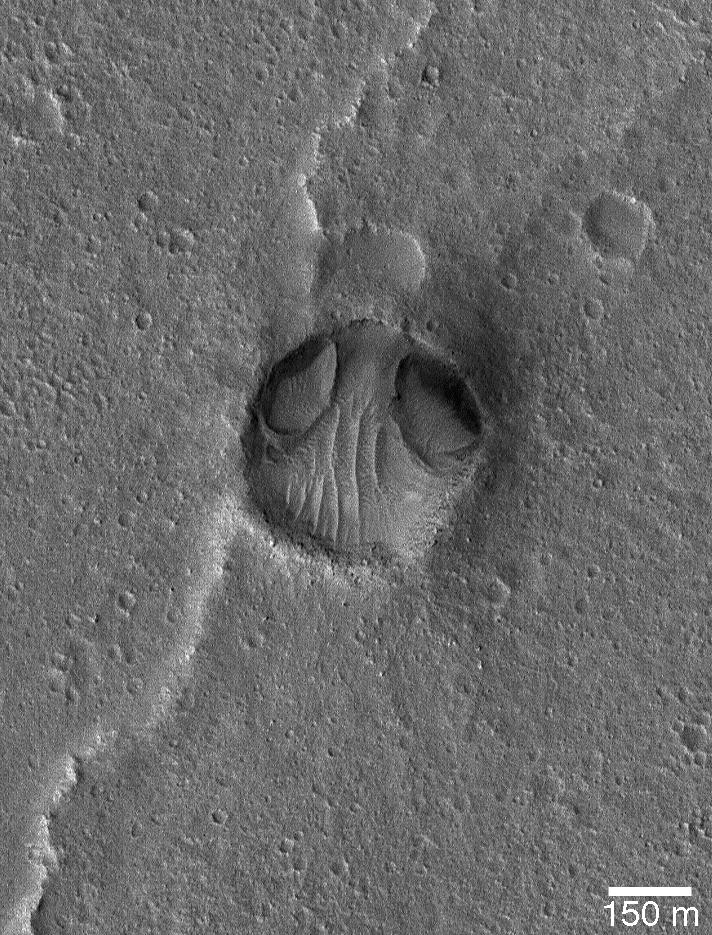
The Chryse Alien, a crater in the Chryse Planitia

The Chryse Alien is a crater in the Chryse Planitia on Mars, named because of its resemblance to an "alien head".

The crater is in a 712x935 image indexed as PIA07304. The picture was taken by the Mars Orbiter Camera on board the Mars Global Surveyor Orbiter. The image was labelled Chryse "Alien Head" by NASA when it was published on 26 January 2004. The image was part of the Jet Propulsion Laboratory's Photojournal, for 26 January 2005.

This Mars Global Surveyor (MGS) Mars Orbiter Camera (MOC) image shows an impact crater in Chryse Planitia, not too far from the Viking 1 lander site, that to seems to resemble a bug-eyed head. The two odd depressions at the north end of the crater (the "eyes") may have formed by wind or water erosion. This region has been modified by both processes, with water action occurring in the distant past via floods that poured across western Chryse Planitia from Maja Valles, and wind action common occurrence in more recent history. This crater is located near 22.5°N, 47.9°W. The 150 meter scale bar is about 164 yards long. Sunlight illuminates the scene from the left/lower left

— Original NASA caption

The image came to prominence in 2018, when it was rediscovered and proposed as evidence for life on Mars.
