= Kasei Valles =

Valles on Mars

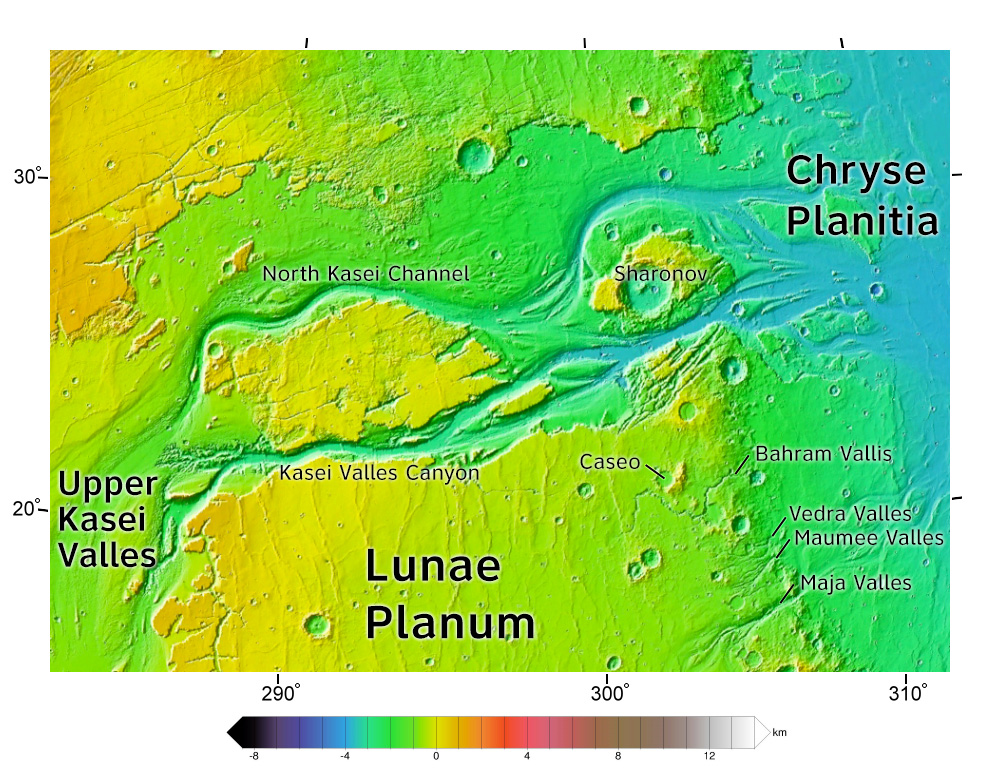
- Vicinity of the Northern Kasei Valles, also showing Bahram Vallis and the Vedra Valles, Maumee Valles, and Maja Valles. Flow was from bottom left. Map is ~1,600 km (990 mi) wide; the system extends south another 1,200 km (750 mi) to Echus Chasma.
- Coordinates: 24.6°N 65.0°W
- Naming: "Mars" in Japanese

The Kasei Valles are a giant system of canyons in Mare Acidalium and Lunae Palus quadrangles on Mars, centered at 24.6° north latitude and 65.0° west longitude. They are 1,580 km (980 mi) long and were named for the word for "Mars" in Japanese. This is one of the largest outflow channel systems on Mars.

== Geography ==
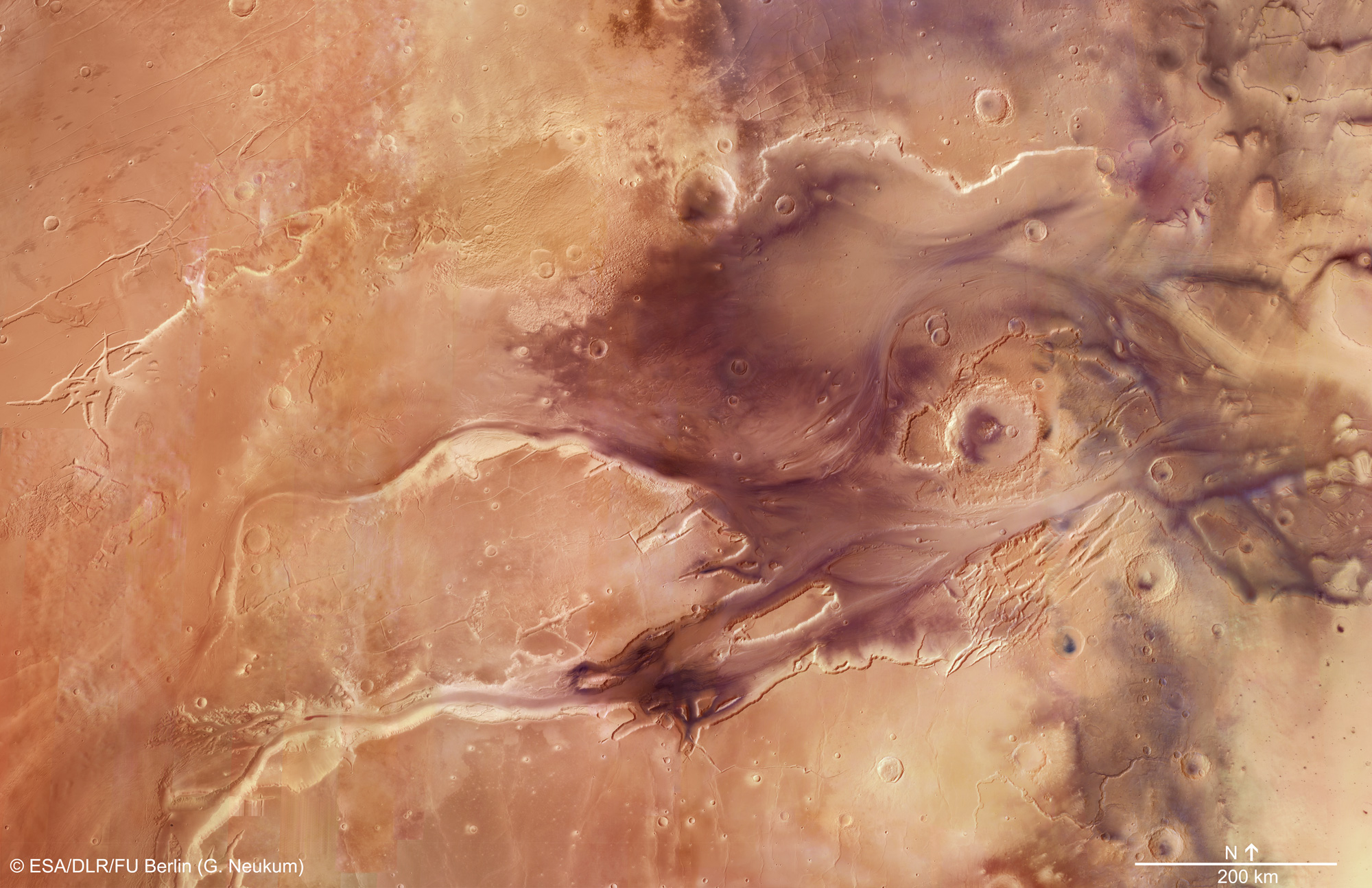
Area around the Northern Kasei Valles in Mars Express images

This huge system is 300 miles wide in some places. In contrast, Earth's Grand Canyon is only 18 miles wide. It is one of the longest continuous outflow channel systems on Mars. The Kasei Valles system begins in Echus Chasma, near Valles Marineris. It runs initially northward, then turns eastward and appears to empty into Chryse Planitia, not far from where Viking 1 landed. At around 20° north latitude the system splits into two channels, called Kasei Vallis Canyon and North Kasei Channel. These branches recombine at around 63° west longitude, forming a large island between the channels known as Sacra Mensa. Some parts of the Kasei Valles are 2–3 km deep.

Like other outflow channels, they were likely carved by liquid water, possibly released by volcanic subsurface heating in the Tharsis region, either as a one-time catastrophic event or multiple flooding events over a long time period. Others have proposed that certain landforms were produced by glacial rather than liquid flow.

Three sets of enormous cataracts (dry falls) are present in the area between an "island" feature in the southern channel, Lunae Mensae, and the crater Sharonov. These cataracts, evidently carved during megaflooding events, have headwalls up to 400 m high and are considerably larger than the largest terrestrial analog, Dry Falls. They may have migrated over 100 km upstream subsequent to their initial formation.

== Gallery ==
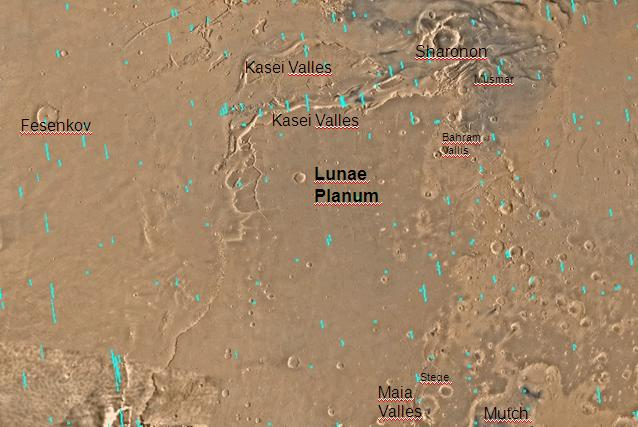
Map of Lunae Palus quadrangle with labels. The Kasei Valles can be seen at the top of the image.

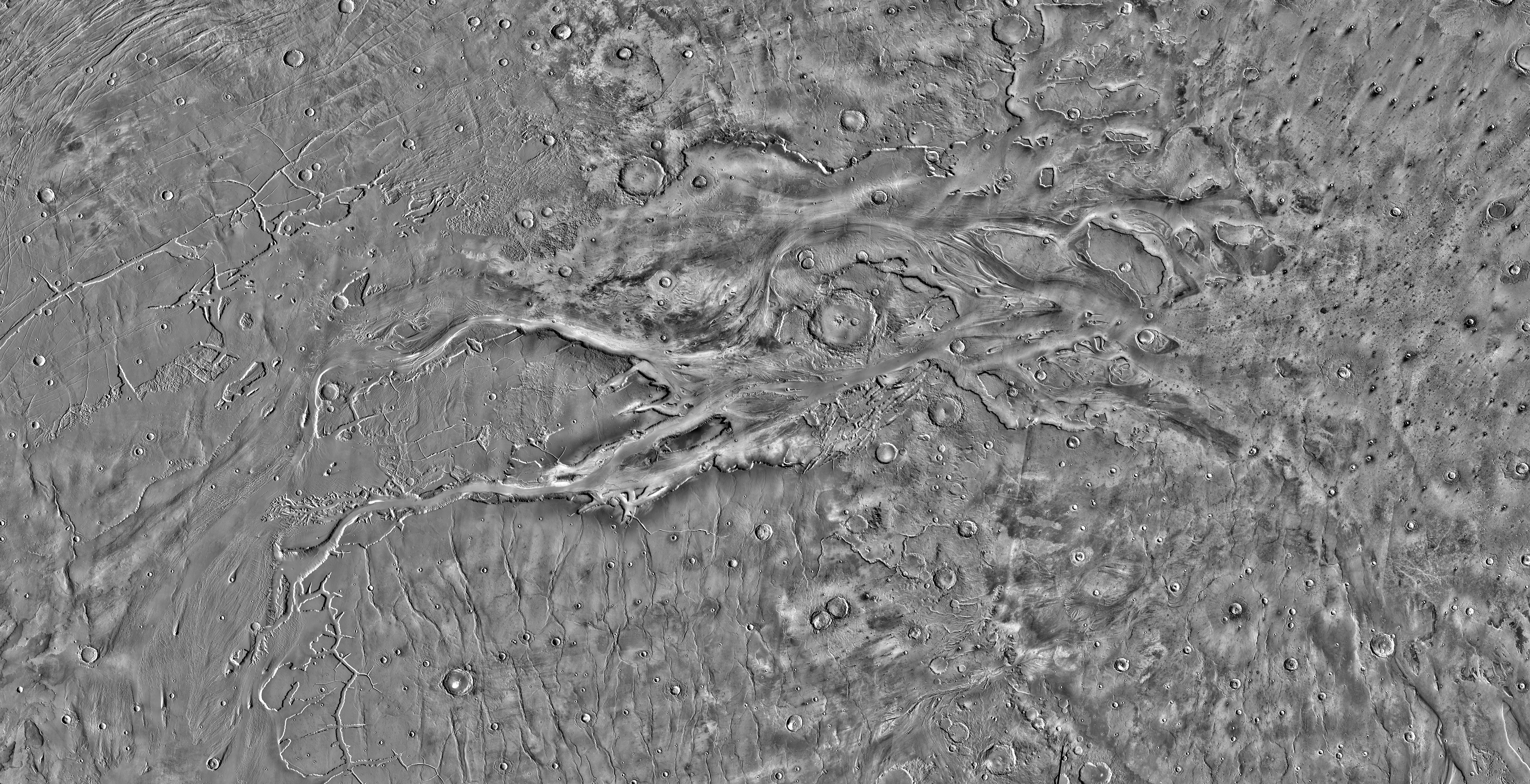
High resolution THEMIS daytime infrared image mosaic of the Kasei Valles and their surroundings.

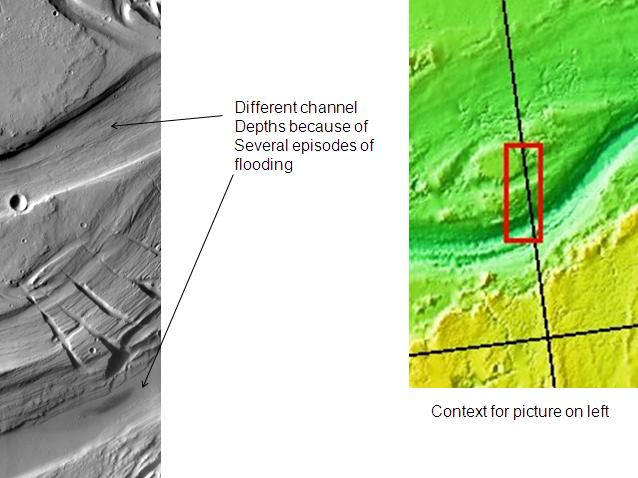
THEMIS image illustrating details of channels.

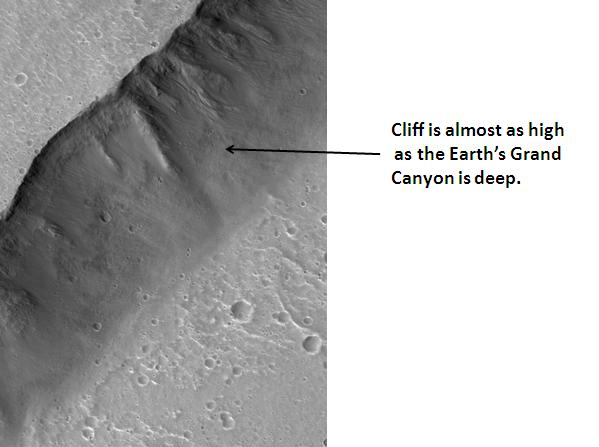
Cliff in the Kasei Valles system, as seen by HiRISE.

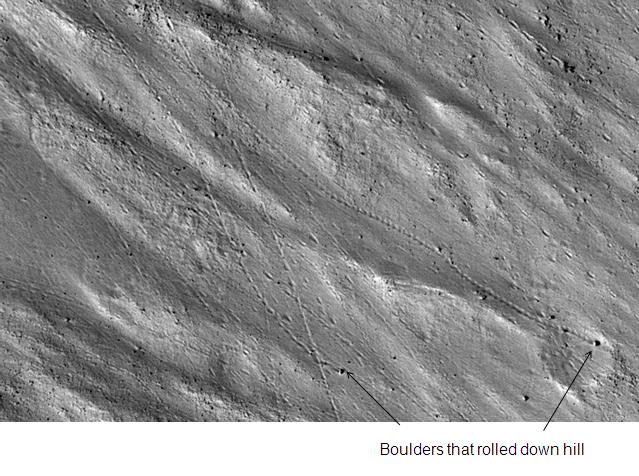
Enlargement of cliff in the Kasei Valles system in previous image showing boulders and their tracks, as seen by HiRISE. The boulders are around 2 m across.

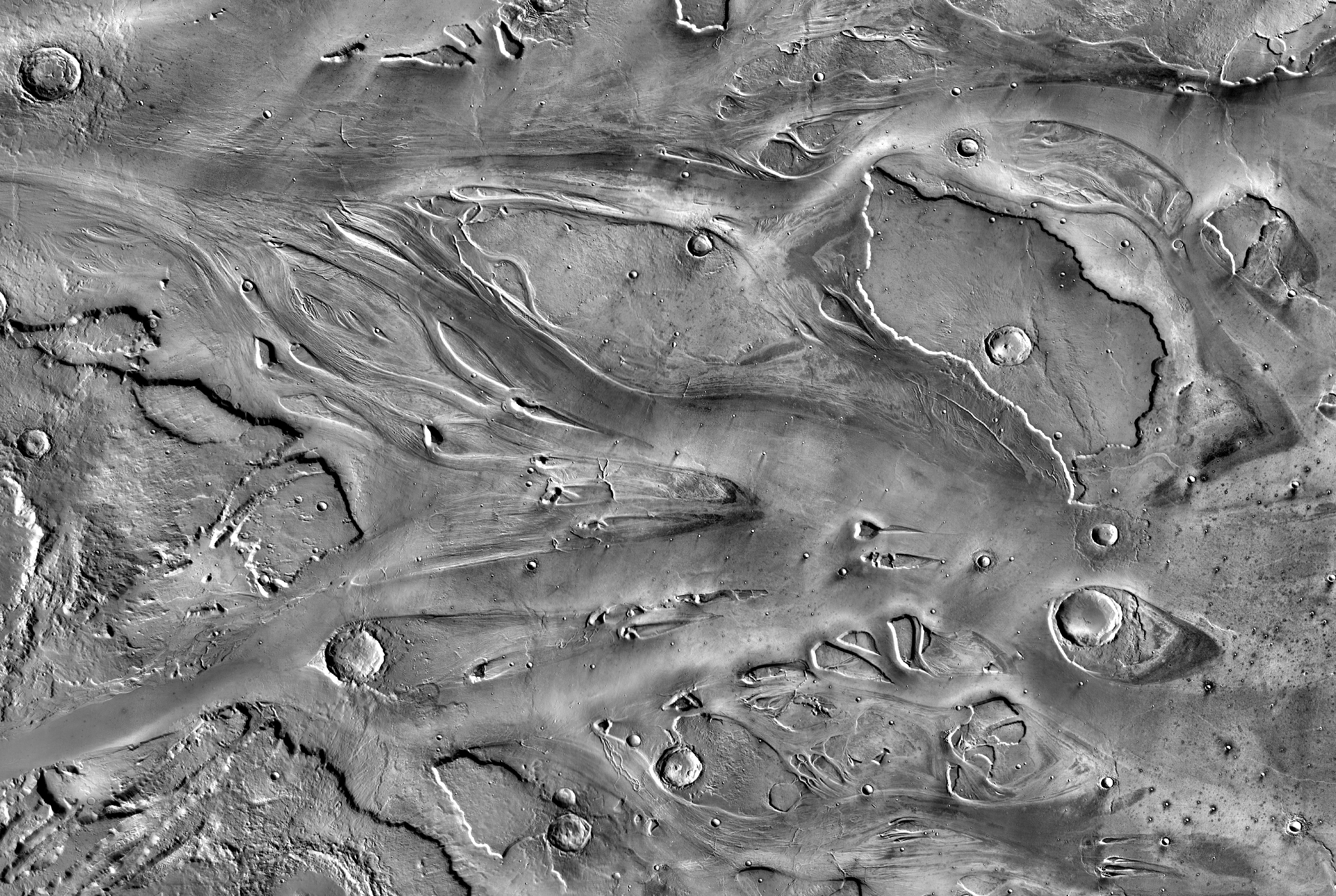
View of streamlined landforms in the Kasei Valles (detail from THEMIS mosaic at left).

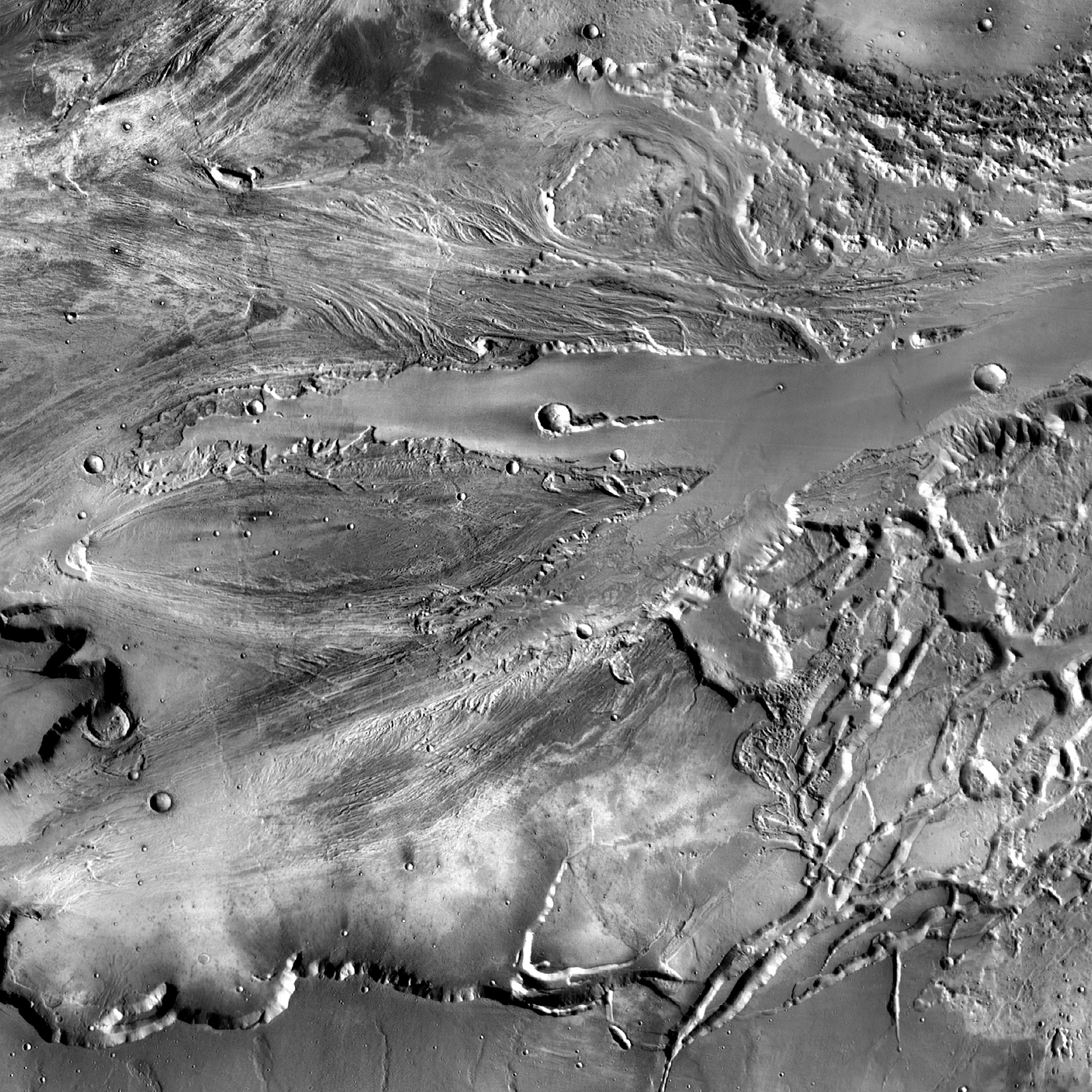
View showing putative cataracts in the Kasei Valles southwest of Sharonov (detail from THEMIS mosaic).
