= Vedra Valles =

Martian channels

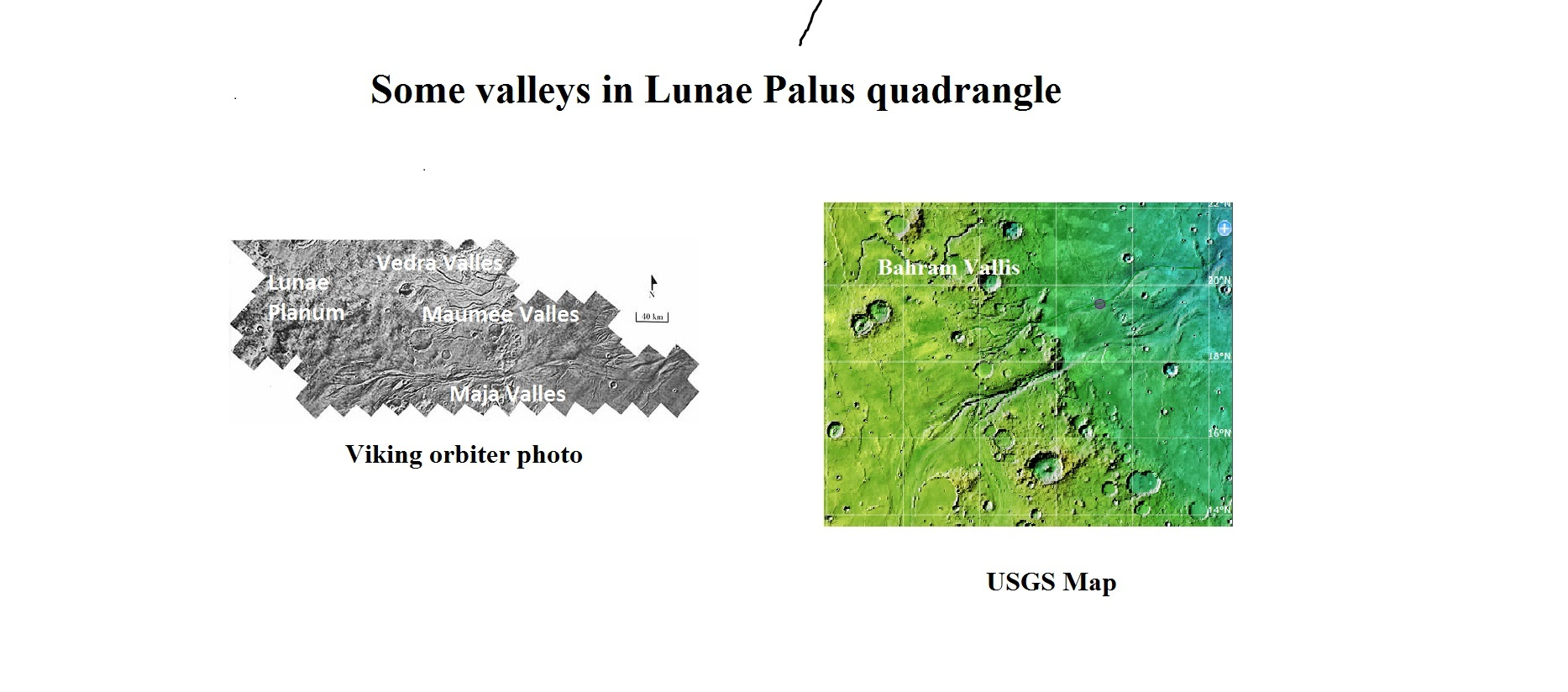
- Waters from the Vedra Valles, Maumee Valles, and Maja Valles flowed from Lunae Planum on the left, to Chryse Planitia on the right. Image is located in Lunae Palus quadrangle and was taken by Viking Orbiter.
- Coordinates: 19.4°N 55.6°W

The Vedra Valles are a set of channels in an ancient river valley in the Lunae Palus quadrangle of Mars, located at 19.4° N and 55.6° W. They are 115 km long and were named after an ancient river in Great Britain.

Together with other ancient river valleys, they have provided strong evidence for a great deal of running water on the surface of Mars.

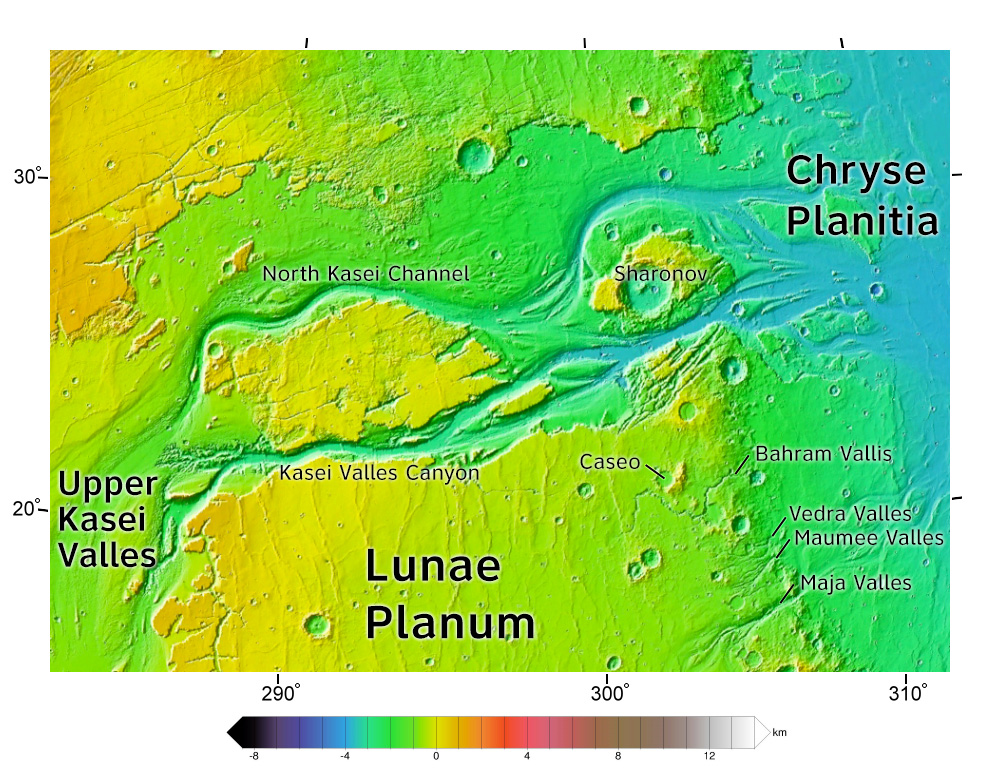
Area around the Northern Kasei Valles, showing relationships among Bahram Vallis and the Kasei Valles, Vedra Valles, Maumee Valles, and Maja Valles. Map location is in Lunae Palus quadrangle and includes parts of Lunae Planum and Chryse Planitia.

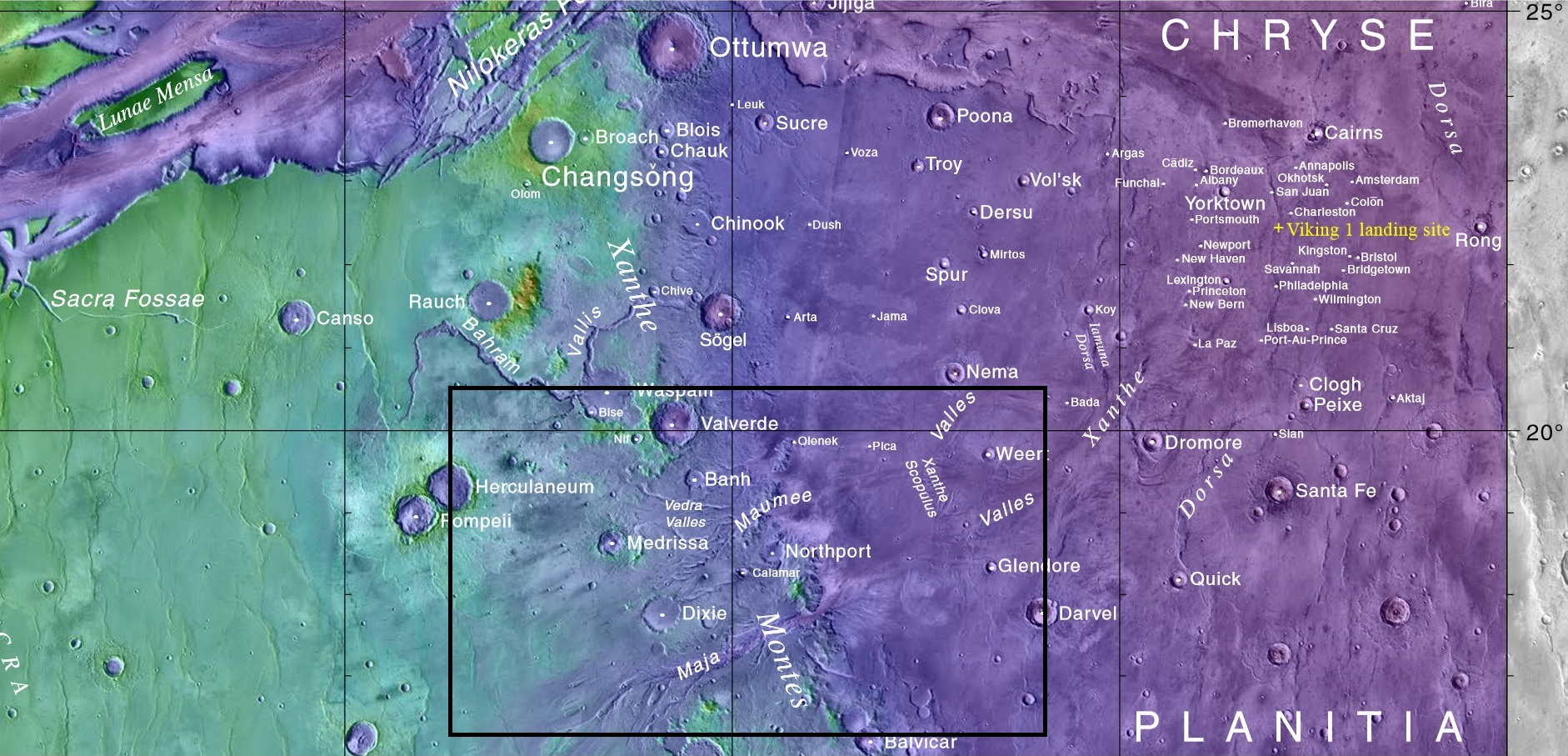
Map showing relative positions of several channel systems in the Lunae Palus quadrangle, including the Vedra Valles, Maumee Valles, and Maja Valles. Box indicates their location; colors designate elevation.

== See also ==
- Geology of Mars
- HiRISE
- Lunae Palus quadrangle
- Outflow channels
