= Bahram Vallis =

Vallis on Mars

- Bahram Vallis based on THEMIS day-time image
- Coordinates: 20.7°N 57.5°W

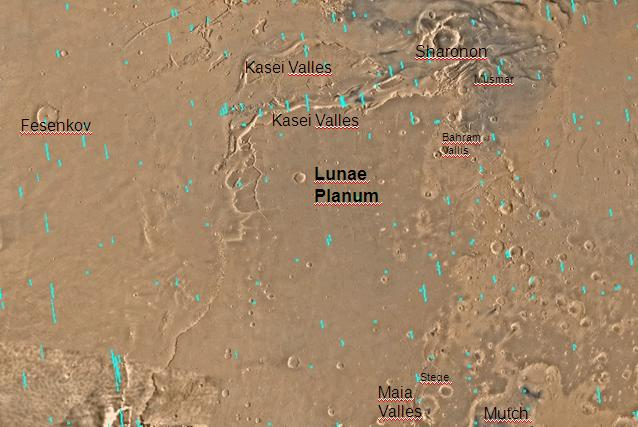
Map of Lunae Palus quadrangle with labels. Kasei Valles is a very large ancient river valley.

Bahram Vallis is an ancient river valley in the Lunae Palus quadrangle of Mars at 20.7° north latitude and 57.5° west longitude. It is about 302 km long and was named after the word for 'Mars' in Persian. Bahram Vallis is located midway between Vedra Valles and lower Kasei Valles. It is basically a single trunk valley, with scalloped walls in some places. The presence of streamlined erosional features on its floor shows that fluid was involved with its formation.

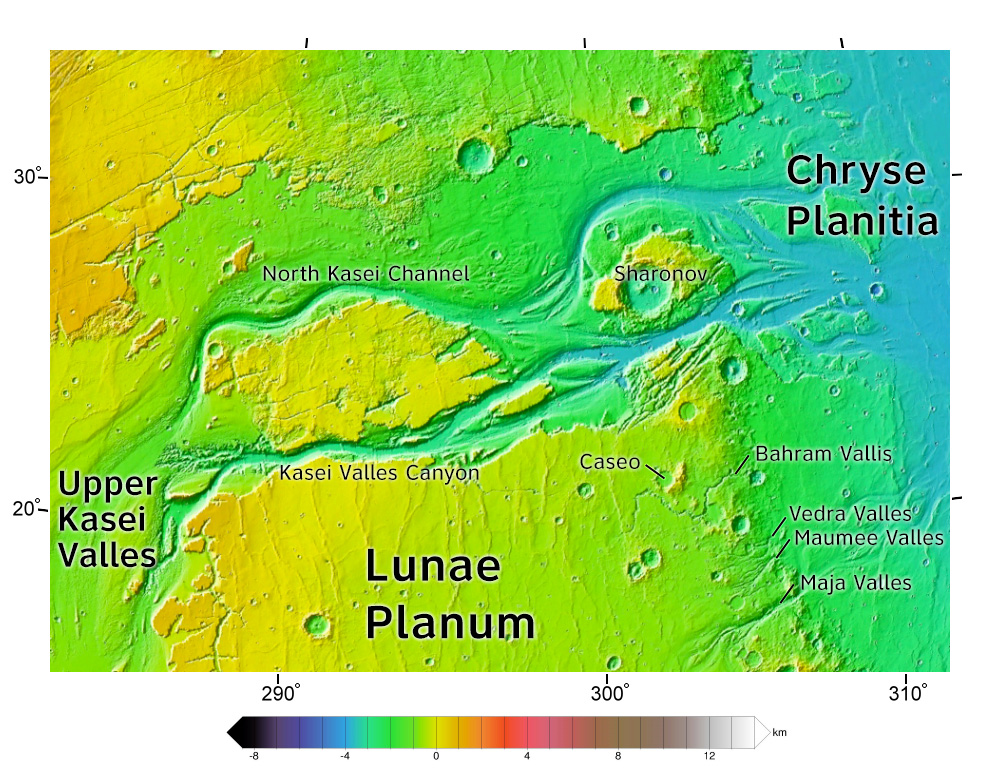
Area around Northern Kasei Valles, showing relationships among Kasei Valles, Bahram Vallis, Vedra Valles, Maumee Valles, and Maja Valles. Map location is in Lunae Palus quadrangle and includes parts of Lunae Planum and Chryse Planitia.

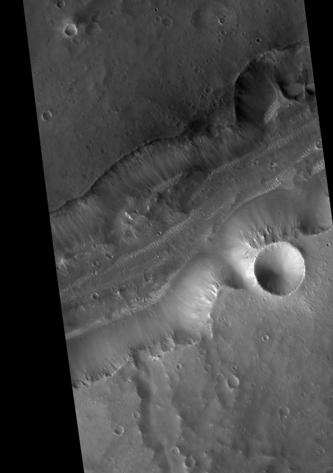
Bahram Vallis, as seen by HiRISE. Rotational landslides (slumps) are visible at the base of north wall.

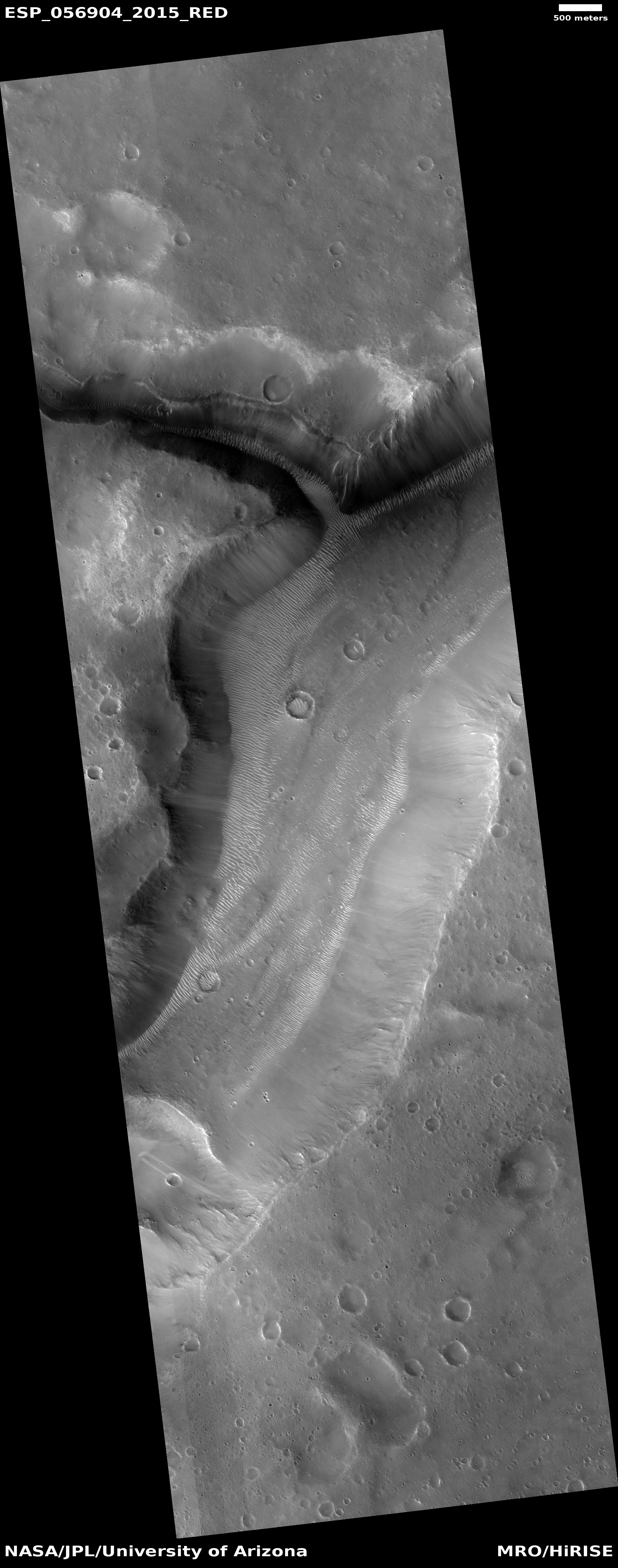
Close view of part of Bahram Vallis, as seen by HiRISE under HiWish program

== See also ==
- Geology of Mars
- HiRISE
- Lunae Palus quadrangle
- Outflow channels
