= Shalbatana Vallis =

Martian landscape feature

- Location: Oxia Palus quadrangle
- Coordinates: 7.8°N 42.1°W
- Naming: Word for "Mars" in Akkadian.

Shalbatana Vallis is an ancient water-worn channel on Mars, located in the Oxia Palus quadrangle at 7.8° north latitude and 42.1° west longitude. It is the westernmost of the southern Chryse outflow channels. Beginning in a zone of chaotic terrain called Orson Welles crater, at 0° latitude and 46° W longitude, it ends in Chryse Planitia.

== Appearance ==
Shalbatana Vallis contains the first definitive evidence of a Martian shoreline. This shoreline was part of an ancient lake 80 square miles (210 km^{2}) in size and 1,500 feet (460 m) deep. The study carried out with HiRISE images indicates that water formed a 30 miles (48 km) long canyon that opened up into a valley, deposited sediment, and created a delta. This delta and others around the basin imply the existence of a large, long-lived lake. Of special interest is evidence that the lake formed after the warm, wet period was thought to have ended. So, lakes may have been around much longer than previously thought.

It is the word for "Mars" in Akkadian.

== Gallery ==
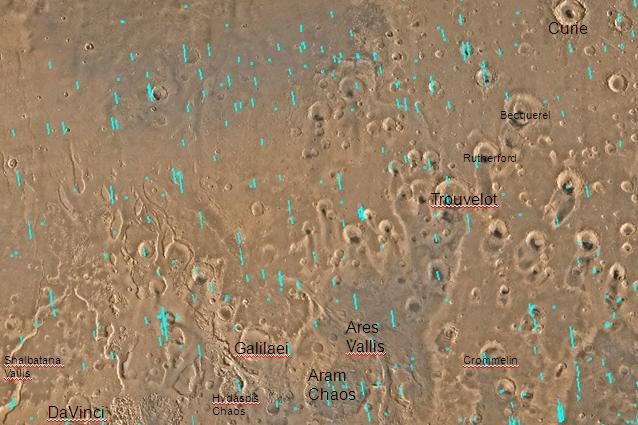
Quadrangle map of Oxia Palus labeled with major features. This quadrangle contains many collapsed areas of Chaos and many outflow channels (thought to be carved by catastrophic floods).

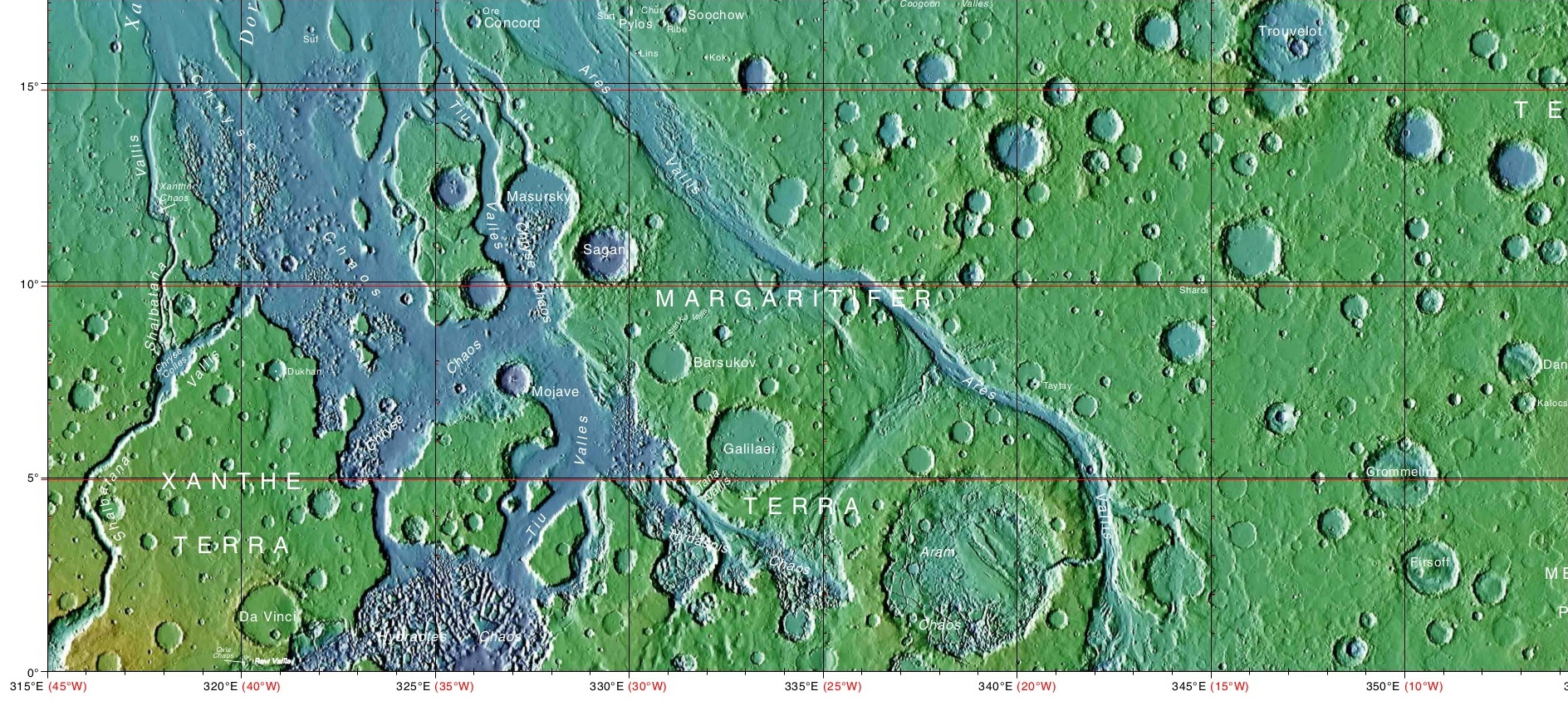
Topographic map of Oxia Palus region of Mars showing the location of a number of chaos regions and valleys, including Shalbatana Vallis

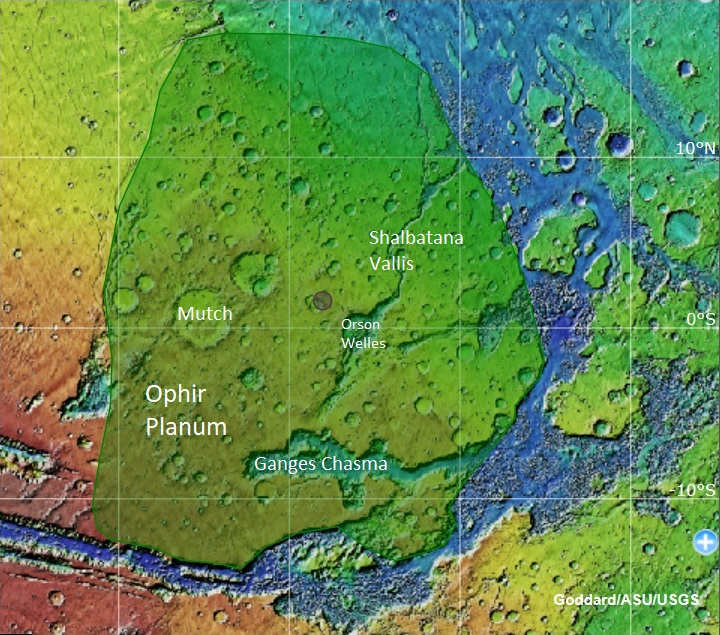
Map of Xanthe Terra showing location of Shalbatana Vallis and other major features

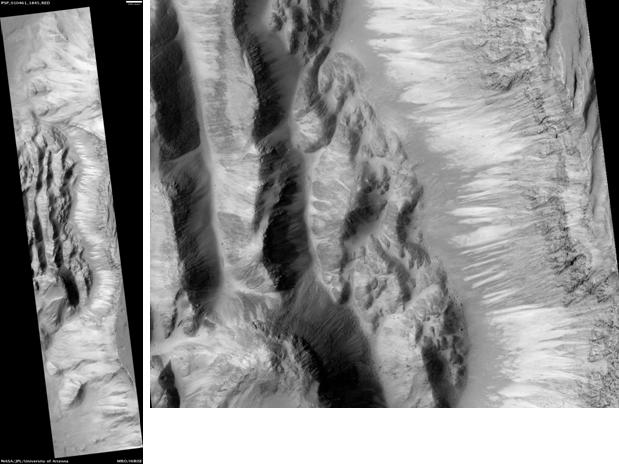
Shalbatana Vallis Floor, as seen by HiRISE. Scale bar is 1000 meters long.

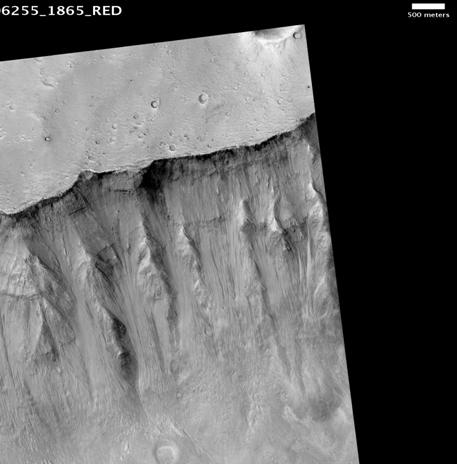
Shalbatana Vallis, as seen by HiRISE. The scale bar is 500 meters long.

== See also ==
- Chaos terrain
- Geology of Mars
- HiRISE
- Lakes on Mars
- List of areas of chaos terrain on Mars
- Martian chaos terrain
- Outburst flood
- Outflow channels
