= Chryse Planitia =

Planitia on Mars

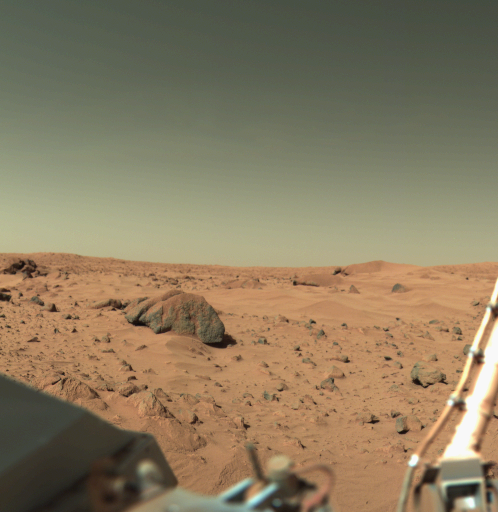
- This image was acquired at the Viking Lander 1 site in Chryse Planitia. It has been reproduced as a false color image.
- Feature type: Plains
- Location: North of Margaritifer Terra, south of Acidalia Planitia, west of Arabia Terra
- Coordinates: 28.4°N 319.7°E
- Diameter: 1,600 kilometres (990 mi)
- Eponym: Legendary island Chryse

Chryse Planitia /ˈkraɪsiː pləˈnɪʃiə/ (Greek, "Golden Plain") is a smooth circular plain in the northern equatorial region of Mars close to the Tharsis region to the west, centered at 28.4°N 319.7°E. Chryse Planitia lies partially in the Lunae Palus quadrangle, partially in the Oxia Palus quadrangle, partially in the Mare Acidalium quadrangle. It is 1600 km or 994 mi in diameter and with a floor 2.5 km below the average planetary surface altitude, and has been suggested to be an ancient buried impact basin, though this is contested. It has several features in common with lunar maria, such as wrinkle ridges. The density of impact craters in the 100 to 2,000 metres (330 to 6,560 ft) range is close to half the average for lunar maria.

Chryse Planitia shows evidence of water erosion in the past, and is the bottom end for many outflow channels from the southern highlands as well as from Valles Marineris and the flanks of the Tharsis bulge. It is one of the lowest regions on Mars (2 to 3 kilometres (1.2 to 1.9 mi) below the mean surface elevation of Mars), so water would tend to flow into it

The elevation generally goes down from the Tharsis Ridge to Chryse. Kasei Valles, Maja Valles, and Nanedi Valles appear to run from high areas (Tharsis Ridge) to Chryse Planitia. On the other side of Chryse, to the east, the land gets higher. Ares Vallis travels from this high region, then empties into Chryse. Much of Tiu Valles and Simud Valles move toward Chryse as well. Several ancient river valleys discovered in Chryse Planitia by the Viking Orbiters, as part of the Viking program, provided strong evidence for a great deal of running water on the surface of Mars.

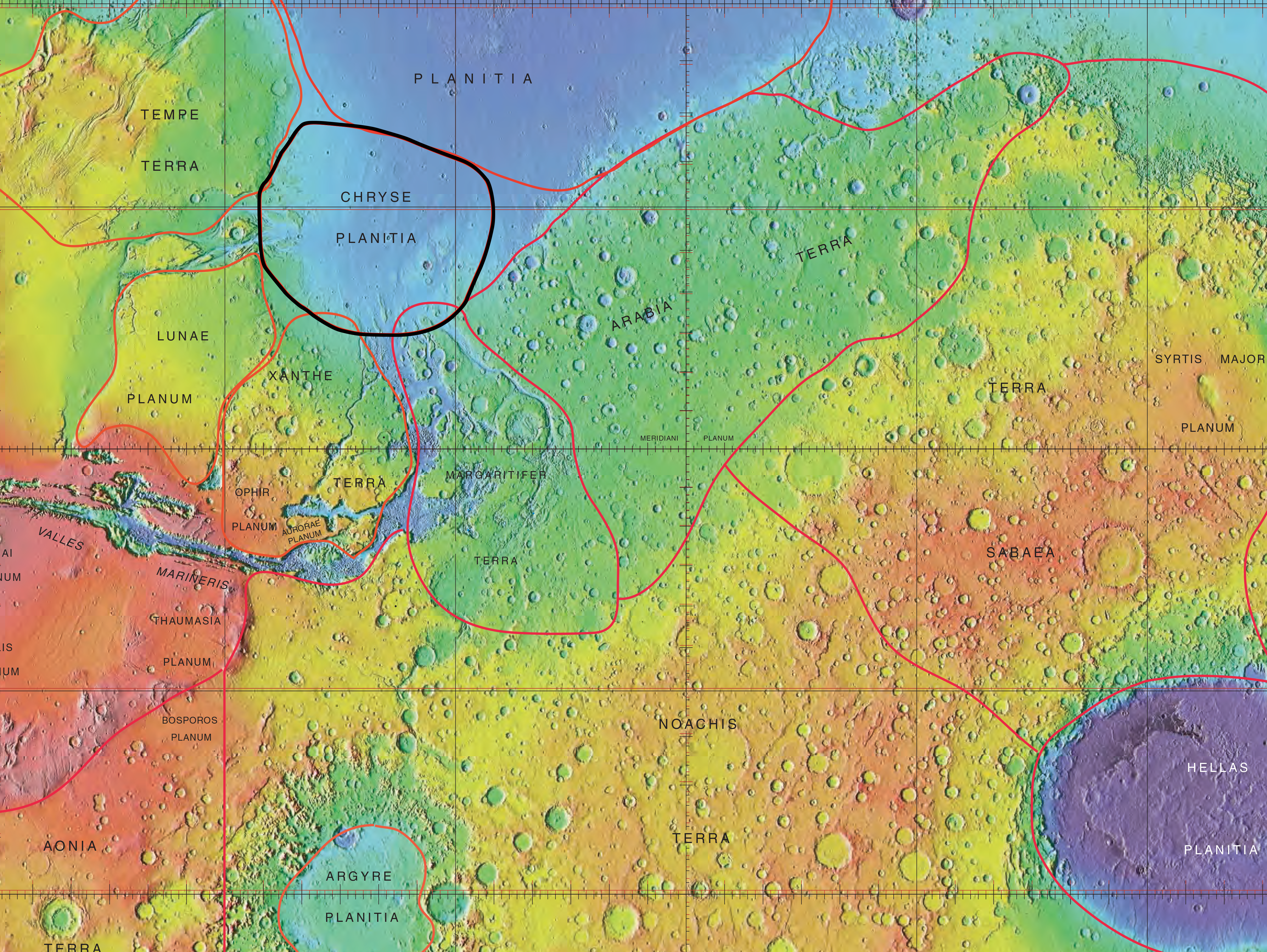
Chryse Planitia Map Relative
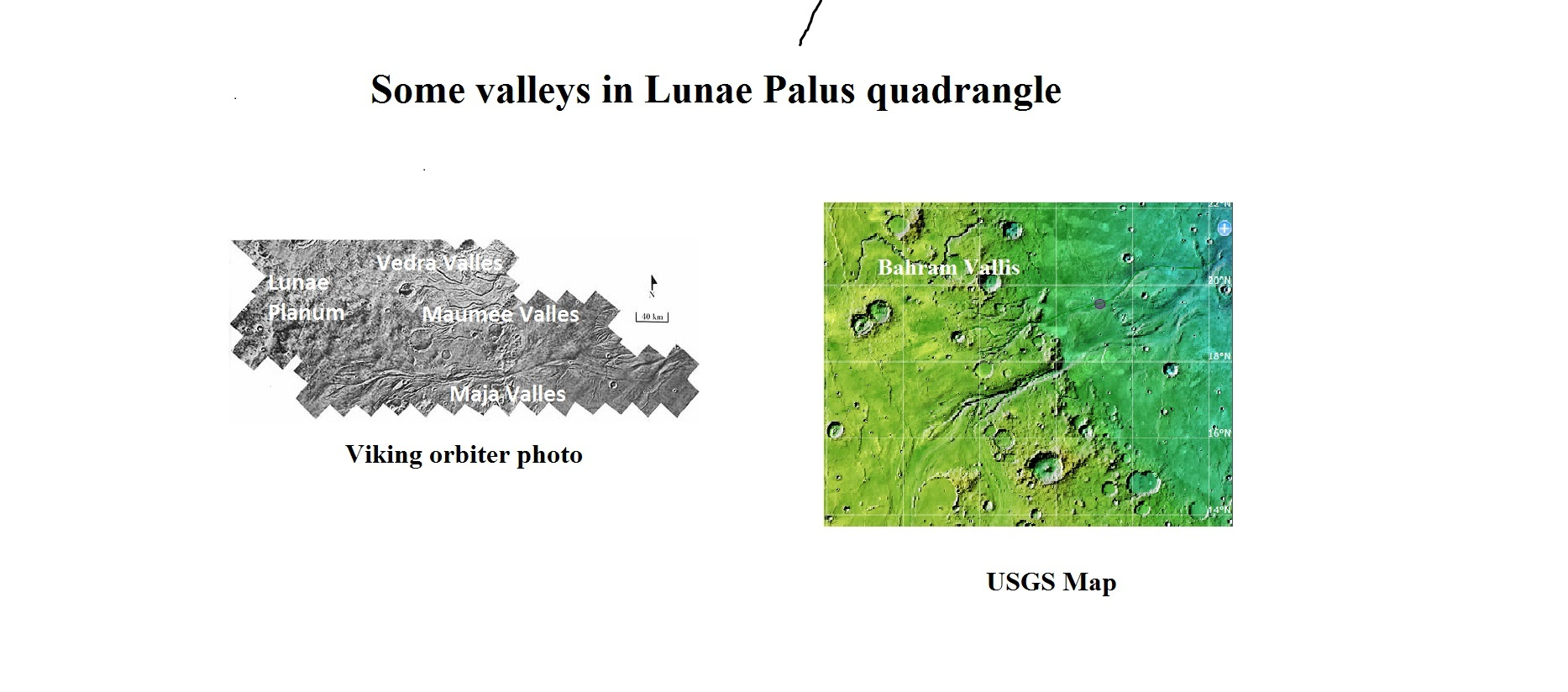
Waters from Vedra Valles, Maumee Valles, and Maja Valles went from Lunae Planum on the left, to Chryse Planitia on the right. Image is located in Lunae Palus quadrangle and was taken by Viking Orbiter.

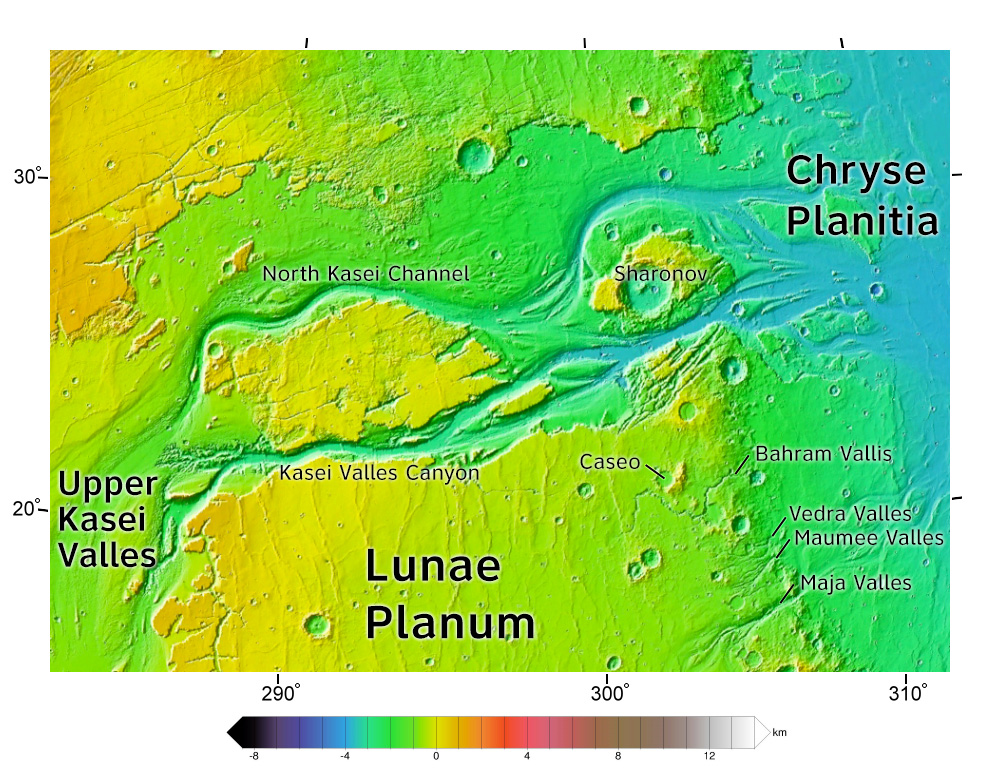
Area around Northern Kasei Valles, showing relationships among Kasei Valles, Bahram Vallis, Vedra Valles, Maumee Valles, and Maja Valles. Map location is in Lunae Palus quadrangle and includes parts of Lunae Planum and Chryse Planitia. These river valleys once carried water to Chryse Planitia, a low area.

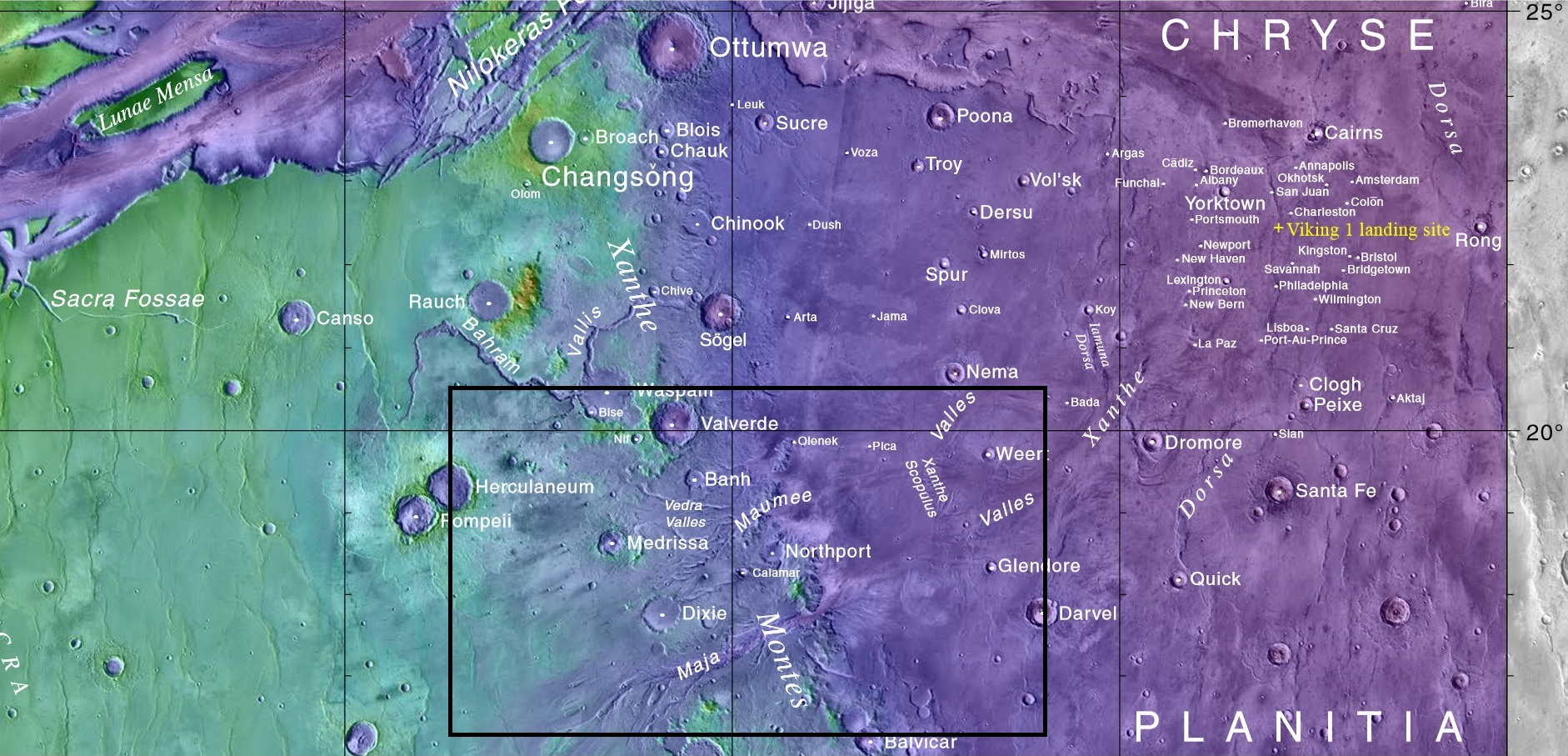
Map showing relative positions of a number of features in and near Chryse Planitia, including Vedra Valles, Maumee Valles, and Maja Valles. Box indicates where these valleys can be found. The Viking 1 landing site is indicated. Colors show elevation.

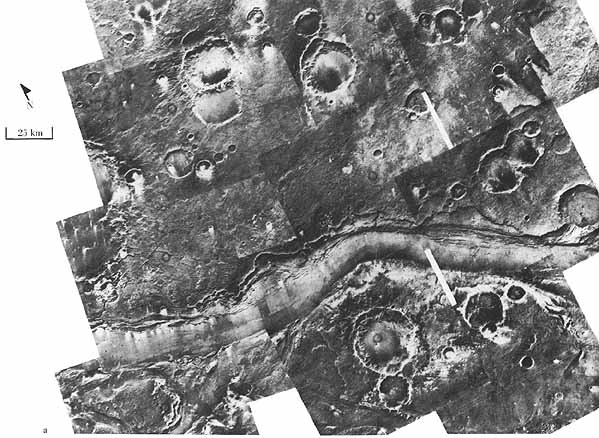
Ares Vallis, capture by Viking and edited as a false color image. The channel is 25 km wide and about 1 km deep. It would be quite spectacular to walk down this valley.

It has been theorized that the Chryse basin may have contained a large lake or an ocean during the Hesperian or early Amazonian periods since all of the large outflow channels entering it end at the same elevation, at which some surface features suggest an ancient shoreline may be present. Chryse basin opens into the North Polar Basin, so if an ocean was present Chryse would have been a large bay.

Viking 1 landed in Chryse Planitia in 1976, but its landing site was not near the outflow channels and no fluvial features were visible; the terrain at that point appeared primarily volcanic in origin. The Mars Pathfinder landed in Ares Vallis, at the end of one of the outflow channels emptying into Chryse.

== See also ==
- Chryse Alien – Crater on Mars
- List of plains on Mars
- Geography of Mars – Delineation and characterization of Martian regions
- Climate of Mars
