= Lunae Palus quadrangle =

Quadrangle map of Mars

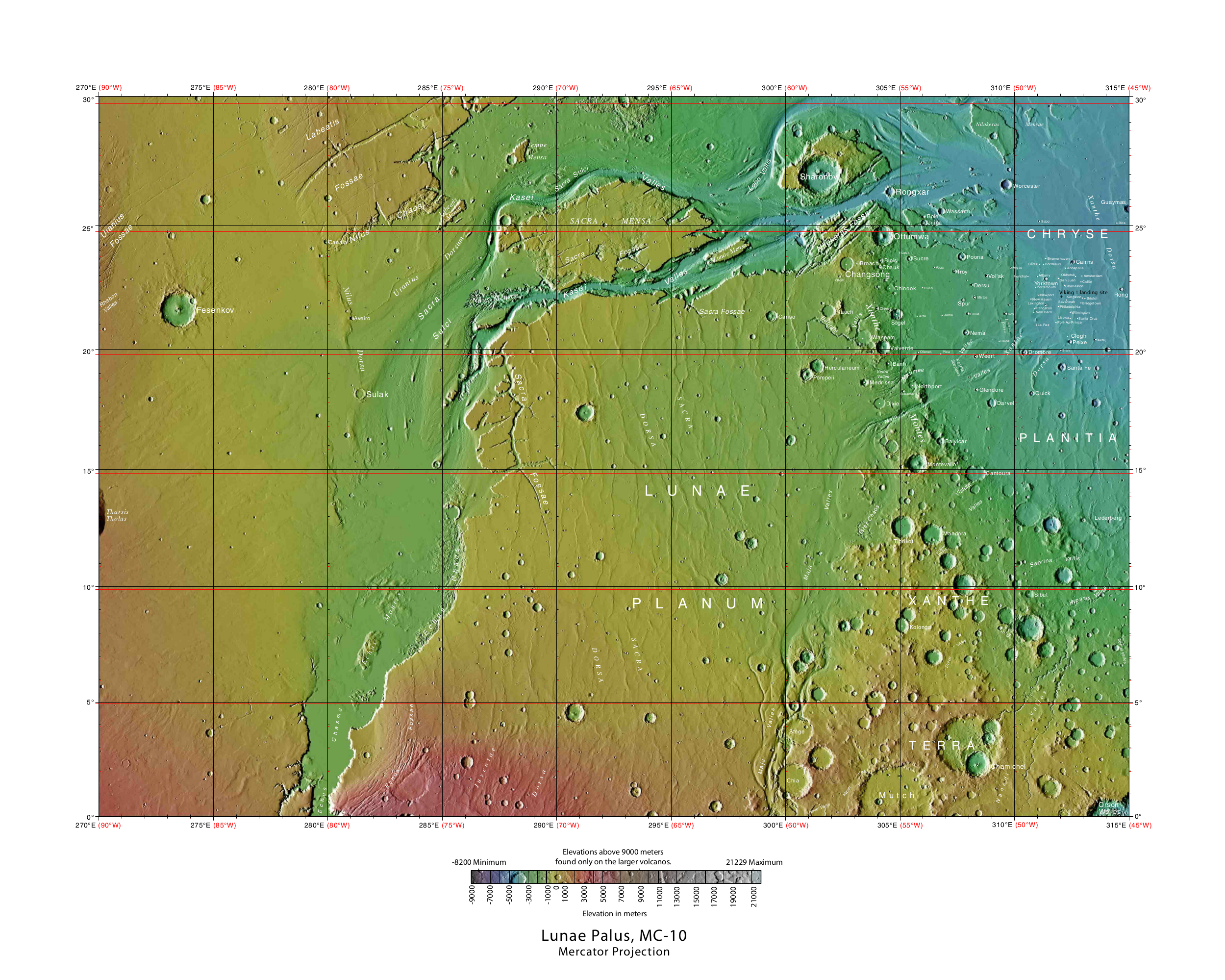
- Map of Lunae Palus quadrangle from Mars Orbiter Laser Altimeter (MOLA) data. The highest elevations are red and the lowest are blue.
- Coordinates: 15°N 67.5°W

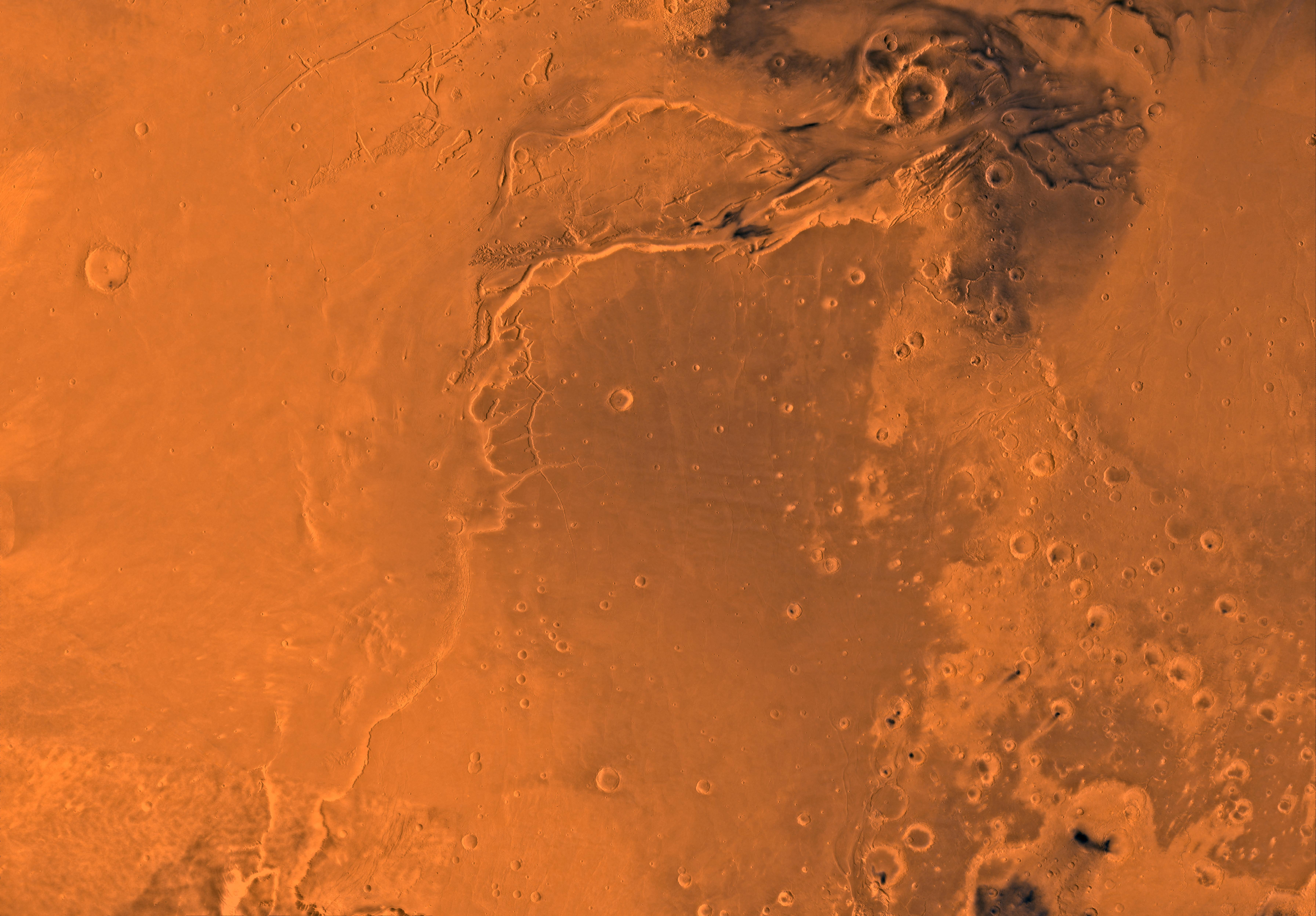
Image of the Lunae Palus Quadrangle (MC-10). The central part includes Lunae Planum which, on the west and north borders, is dissected by Kasei Valles which, in turn, terminates in Chryse Planitia.

The Lunae Palus quadrangle is one of a series of 30 quadrangle maps of Mars used by the United States Geological Survey (USGS) Astrogeology Research Program. The quadrangle is also referred to as MC-10 (Mars Chart-10). Lunae Planum and parts of Xanthe Terra and Chryse Planitia are found in the Lunae Palus quadrangle. The Lunae Palus quadrangle contains many ancient river valleys.

The quadrangle covers the area from 45° to 90° west longitude and 0° to 30° north latitude on Mars. The Viking 1 Lander (part of Viking program) landed in the quadrangle on July 20, 1976, at 22.4°N 47.5°W. It was the first robot spacecraft to successfully land on the Red Planet.

== Results from Viking I mission ==
=== What would it look like walking around the landing site ===
The sky would be a light pink. The dirt would also appear pink. Rocks of many sizes would be spread about. One large rock, named Big Joe, is as big as a banquet table. Some boulders would show erosion due to the wind. There would be many small sand dunes that are still active. The wind speed would typically be 7 meters per second (16 miles per hour). There would be a hard crust on the top of the soil similar to a deposit, called caliche which is common in the U.S. Southwest. Such crusts are formed by solutions of minerals moving up through soil and evaporating at the surface.

=== Analysis of soil ===
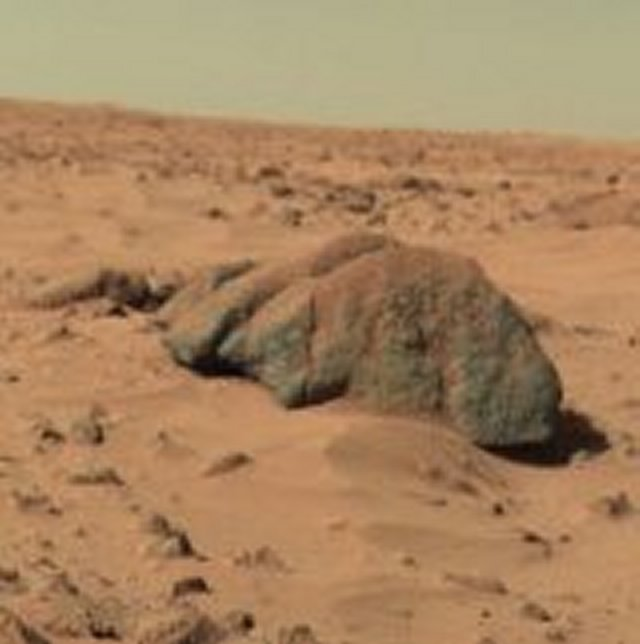
"Big Joe" rock on Mars—viewed by the Viking 1 Lander (February 11, 1978)

The soil resembled those produced from the weathering of basaltic lavas. The tested soil contained abundant silicon and iron, along with significant amounts of magnesium, aluminum, sulfur, calcium, and titanium. Trace elements, strontium and yttrium, were detected. The amount of potassium was five times lower than the average for the Earth's crust. Some chemicals in the soil contained sulfur and chlorine that were like those remaining after the evaporation of sea water. Sulfur was more concentrated in the crust on top of the soil than in the bulk soil beneath. The sulfur may be present as sulfates of sodium, magnesium, calcium, or iron. A sulfide of iron is also possible. Both the Spirit rover and the Opportunity rover also found sulfates on Mars; consequently sulfates may be common on the Martian surface. The Opportunity rover (landed in 2004 with advanced instruments) found magnesium sulfate and calcium sulfate at Meridiani Planum. Using results from the chemical measurements, mineral models suggest that the soil could be a mixture of about 80% iron-rich clay, about 10% magnesium sulfate (kieserite?), about 5% carbonate (calcite), and about 5% iron oxides (hematite, magnetite, goethite?). These minerals are typical weathering products of mafic igneous rocks. Studies with magnets aboard the landers indicated that the soil is 3–7% magnetic materials by weight. The magnetic chemicals could be magnetite and maghemite. These could come from the weathering of basalt rock. Experiments carried out by the Mars Spirit rover (landed in 2004) indicated that magnetite could explain the magnetic nature of the dust and soil on Mars. Magnetite was found in the soil and that the most magnetic part of the soil was dark. Magnetite is very dark.

=== Search for life ===
Viking did three experiments looking for life. The results were surprising and interesting. Most scientists now believe that the data were due to inorganic chemical reactions of the soil. But a few still believe the results were due to living reactions. No organic chemicals were found in the soil; hence nearly all the scientific community thought that no life was found because no organic chemicals were detected. Not finding any organics was unusual since meteorites raining on Mars for 5 billion years or so would surely bring some organics. Moreover, dry areas of Antarctica do not have detectable organic compounds either, but they have organisms living in the rocks. Mars has almost no ozone layer, unlike the Earth, so UV light sterilizes the surface and produces highly reactive chemicals such as peroxides that would oxidize any organic chemicals. Perchlorate may be the oxidizing chemical. The Phoenix lander discovered the chemical perchlorate in the Martian Soil. Perchlorate is a strong oxidant so it may have destroyed any organic matter on the surface. If it is widespread on Mars, carbon-based life would be difficult at the soil surface.

The question of life on Mars received a new, important twist when research, published in the Journal of Geophysical Research in September 2010, proposed that organic compounds were actually present in the soil analyzed by both Viking 1 and 2. NASA's Phoenix lander in 2008 detected perchlorate which can break down organic compounds. The study's authors found that perchlorate will destroy organics when heated and will produce chloromethane and dichloromethane, the identical chlorine compounds discovered by both Viking landers when they performed the same tests on Mars. Because perchlorate would have broken down any Martian organics, the question of whether or not Viking found life is still wide open.

== Mars Science Laboratory ==
Hypanis Vallis, in the Lunae Palus quadrangle, was one of the sites proposed as a landing site for the Mars Science Laboratory, popularly known as the Mars Curiosity rover. One aim of the Mars Science Laboratory is to search for signs of ancient life, as many Martian rocks occur in a context of hydrogeology, that is, they were formed in water, at the bottom of lakes or seas, or by water percolating through the soil, although Brown University researchers have recently suggested outgassing of steam to atmosphere from a new planet's interior can also produce the clay minerals seen in these rocks.

Because such issues remain unresolved, it is hoped that a later mission could return samples from sites identified as offering best chances for remains of life. To bring the craft down safely, a 12-mile wide, smooth, flat circle was needed. Geologists hoped to examine places where water once ponded, and to examine its sediment layers. The site eventually settled on for the Mars Science Laboratory was Gale Crater in the Aeolis quadrangle, and a successful landing took place there in 2012. The rover is still operational as of early 2019. NASA scientists believe Gale Crater's floor rocks are indeed sedimentary, formed in pooled water.

== Kasei Valles ==
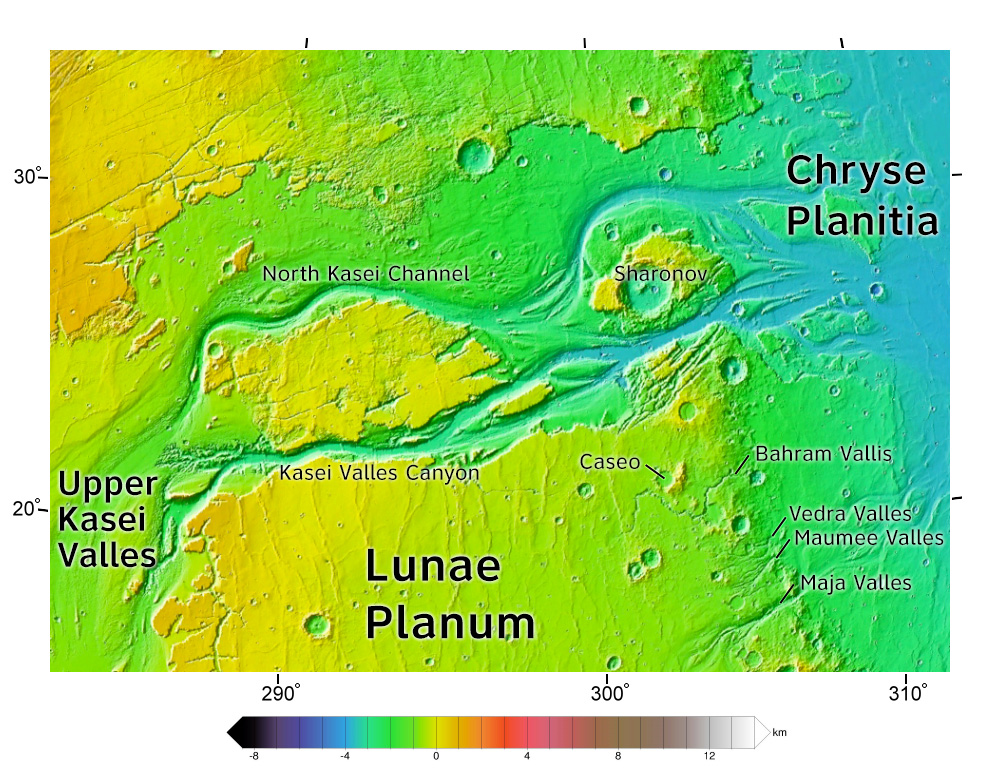
Area around northern Kasei Valles, showing relationships among Kasei Valles, Bahram Vallis, Vedra Valles, Maumee Valles, and Maja Valles. Map location is in Lunae Palus quadrangle and includes parts of Lunae Planum and Chryse Planitia.

One of the most significant features of the Lunae Palus region, Kasei Valles, is one of the largest outflow channels on Mars. Like other outflow channels, it was carved by liquid water, probably during gigantic floods.

Kasei is about 2,400 kilometers (1,500 mi) long. Some sections of Kasei Valles are 300 kilometers (190 mi) wide. It begins in Echus Chasma, near Valles Marineris, and empties into Chryse Planitia, not far from where Viking 1 landed. Sacra Mensa, a large tableland, divides Kasei into northern and southern channels. It is one of the longest continuous outflow channels on Mars. At around 20° north latitude Kasei Valles splits into two channels, called Kasei Vallis Canyon and North Kasei Channel. These branches recombine at around 63° west longitude. Some parts of Kasei Valles are 2–3 km deep.

Scientists suggest it was formed several episodes of flooding and maybe by some glacial activity.

== Craters ==
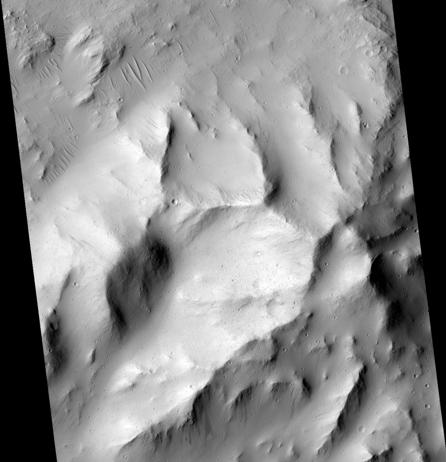
Fesenkov Crater Central Peak, as seen by HiRISE

Impact craters generally have a rim with ejecta around them, in contrast volcanic craters usually do not have a rim or ejecta deposits. As craters get larger (greater than 10 km in diameter) they usually have a central peak. The peak is caused by a rebound of the crater floor following the impact. Sometimes craters will display layers. Craters can show us what lies deep under the surface.

== Fossa ==
Large troughs (long narrow depressions) are called fossae in the geographical language used for Mars. This term is derived from Latin; therefore fossa is singular and fossae is plural. Troughs form when the crust is stretched until it breaks. The stretching can be due to the large weight of a nearby volcano. Fossae/pit craters are common near volcanoes in the Tharsis and Elysium system of volcanoes.

== See also ==
- Chaos terrain
- Climate of Mars
- Fossa (geology)
- Geology of Mars
- HiRISE
- HiWish program
- Impact crater
- Lakes on Mars
- List of areas of chaos terrain on Mars
- List of rocks on Mars
- Martian chaos terrain
- River delta
- Vallis
- Viking program
- Water on Mars

MC-01 Mare Boreum (features)
MC-02 Diacria (features)		MC-03 Arcadia (features)	MC-04 Acidalium (features)	MC-05 Ismenius Lacus (features)		MC-06 Casius (features)	MC-07 Cebrenia (features)
MC-08 Amazonis (features)	MC-09 Tharsis (features)	MC-10 Lunae Palus (features)	MC-11 Oxia Palus (features)	MC-12 Arabia (features)	MC-13 Syrtis Major (features)	MC-14 Amenthes (features)	MC-15 Elysium (features)
MC-16 Memnonia (features)	MC-17 Phoenicis Lacus (features)	MC-18 Coprates (features)	MC-19 Margaritifer Sinus (features)	MC-20 Sinus Sabaeus (features)	MC-21 Iapygia (features)	MC-22 Mare Tyrrhenum (features)	MC-23 Aeolis (features)
MC-24 Phaethontis (features)		MC-25 Thaumasia (features)	MC-26 Argyre (features)	MC-27 Noachis (features)		MC-28 Hellas (features)	MC-29 Eridania (features)
MC-30 Mare Australe (features)
