= Maja Valles =

Valles on Mars

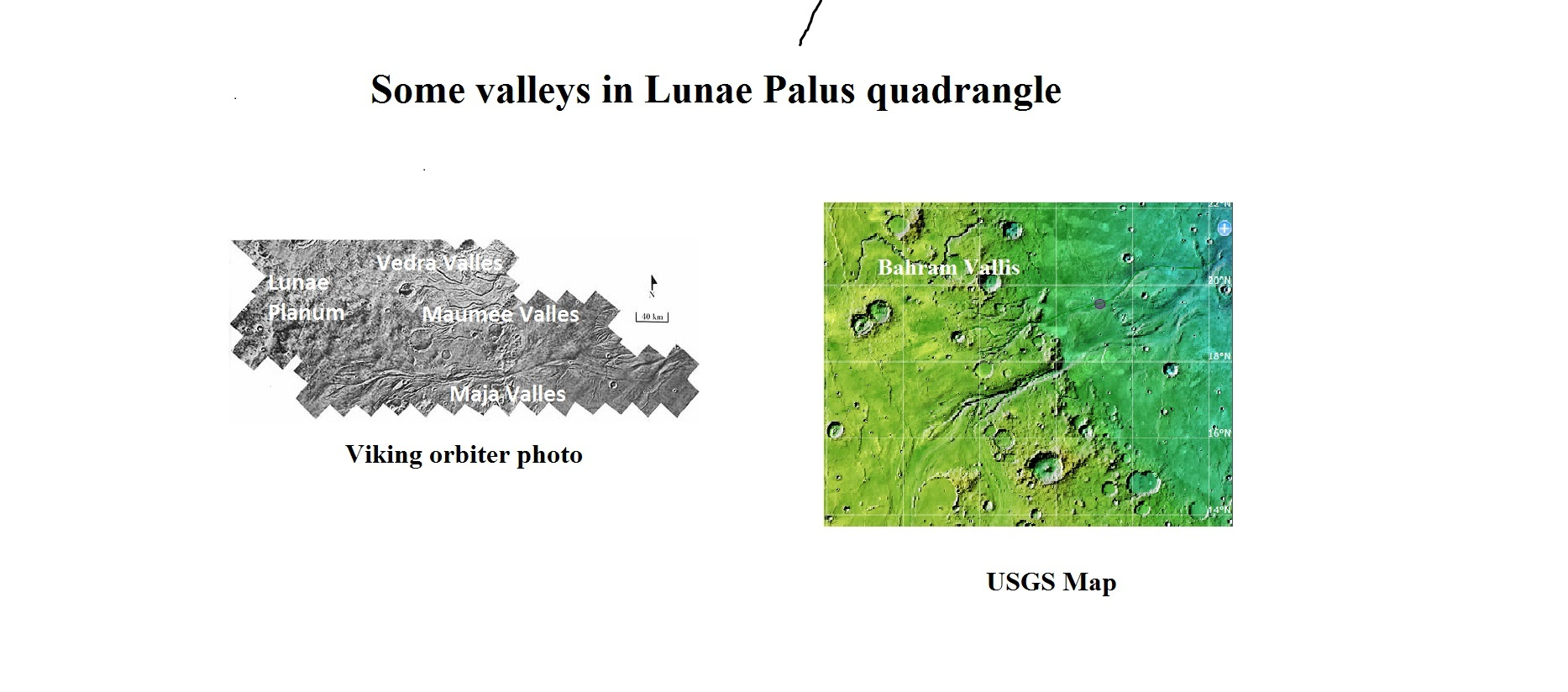
- Waters from the Vedra Valles, Maumee Valles, and Maja Valles went from Lunae Planum on the left, to Chryse Planitia on the right. Image is located in Lunae Palus quadrangle and was taken by Viking Orbiter.
- Coordinates: 12.6°N 58.3°W

The Maja Valles are a large system of ancient outflow channels in the Lunae Palus quadrangle on Mars.

== About ==
Their location is 12.6° north latitude and 58.3° west longitude. The name is a Nepali word for "Mars". The Maja Valles begin at Juventae Chasma. Parts of the system have been partially buried by thin volcanic debris. The channels end at Chryse Planitia.

Huge outflow channels were found in many areas by the Viking Orbiters. They showed that floods of water broke through dams, carved deep valleys, eroded grooves into bedrock, and traveled thousands of kilometers. The Maja Valles show evidence of lava flows in the northern section. Studies with HiRISE and CTX images suggest that the lava flows did not reach the turbulence necessary to erode large channels. So, the Maja Valles are believed to have been formed through water erosion.

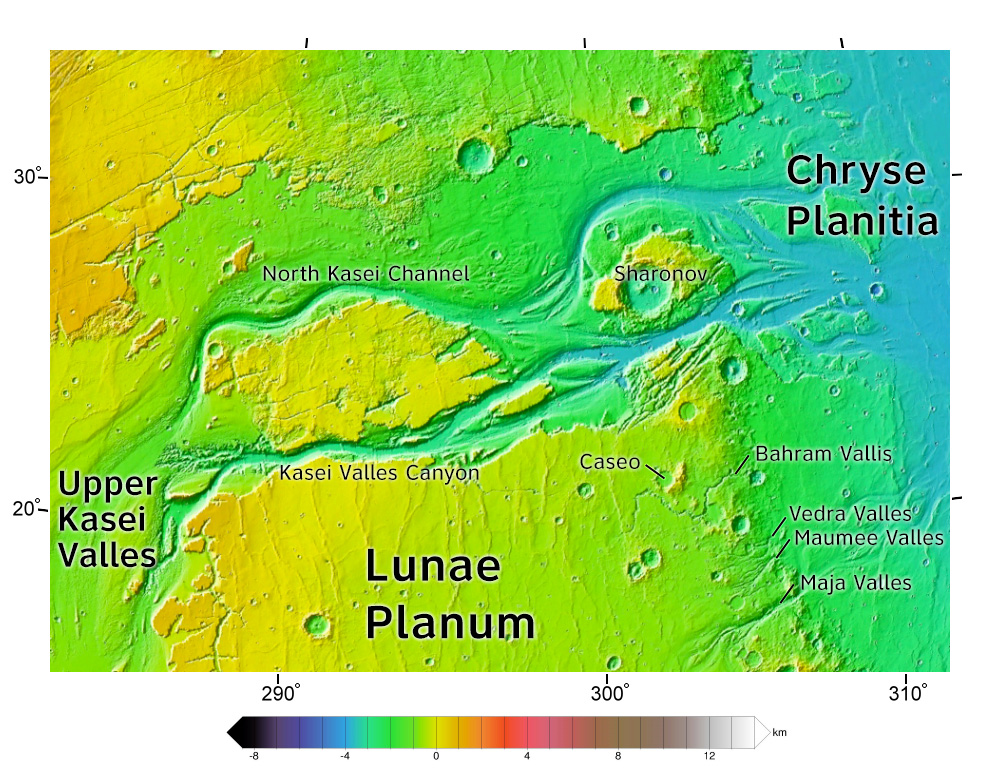
Area around the Northern Kasei Valles, also showing Bahram Vallis and the Vedra Valles, Maumee Valles, and Maja Valles. Map location is in Lunae Palus quadrangle and includes parts of Lunae Planum and Chryse Planitia.

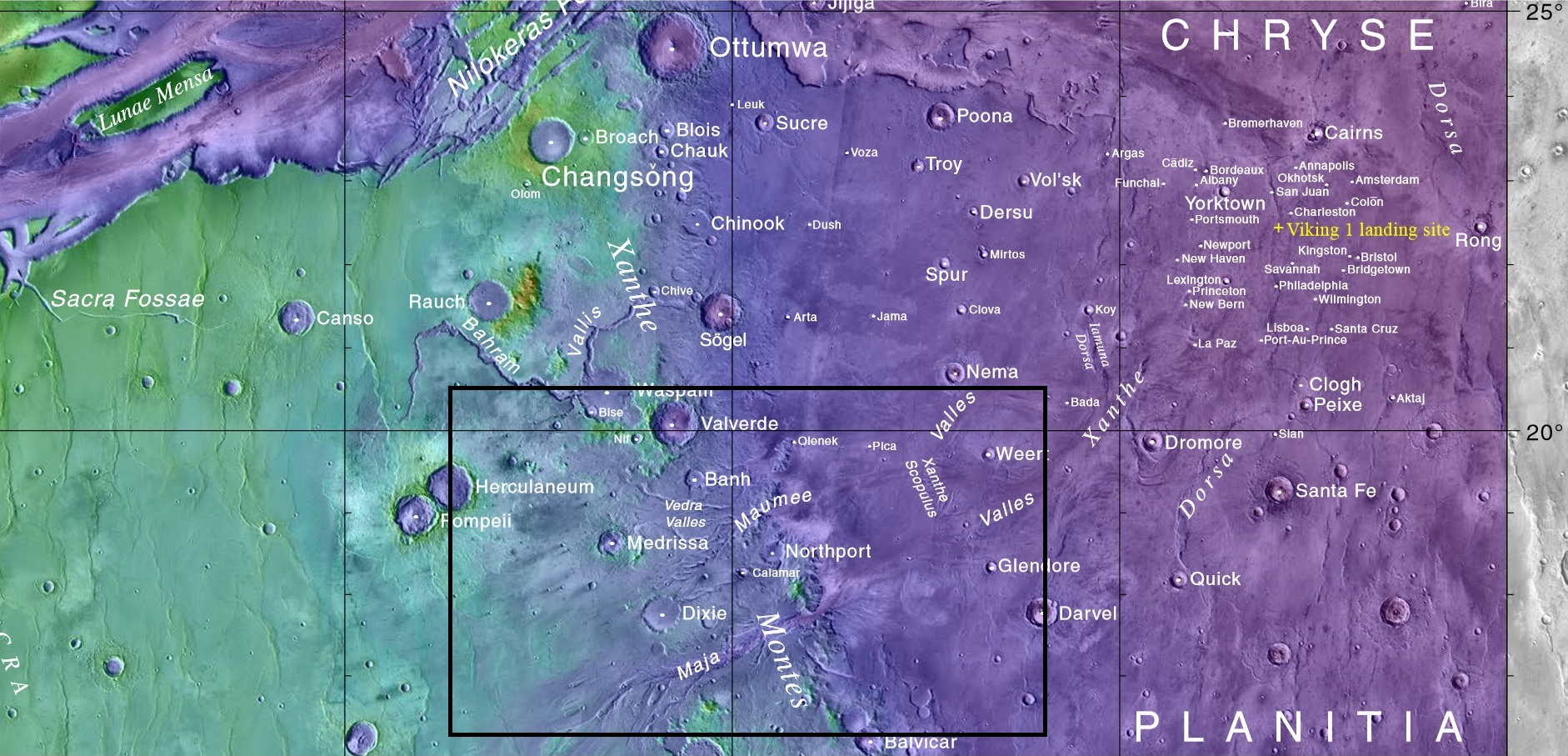
Map showing relative positions of several channel systems in Lunae Palus quadrangle, including the Vedra Valles, Maumee Valles, and Maja Valles. Box indicates where these valleys can be found. Colors show elevation.

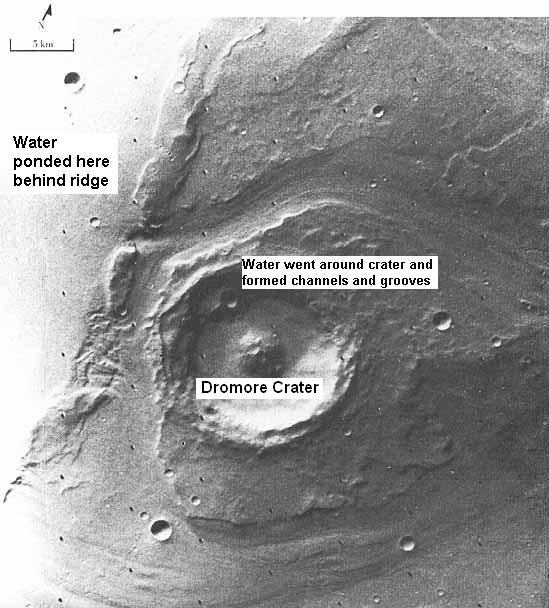
Great amounts of water were required to carry out the erosion shown in this Viking image of a small part of the Maja Valles. Image is located in Lunae Palus quadrangle.

== See also ==
- Chaos terrain – Distinctive area of broken or jumbled terrain
- Geology of Mars – Geology of fourth planet from the Sun
- HiRISE – Camera on board the Mars Reconnaissance Orbiter
- Juventae Chasma – Box canyon on Mars
- Lakes on Mars – Former bodies of water on Mars
- List of areas of chaos terrain on Mars
- Lunae Palus quadrangle – Quadrangle map of Mars
- Martian chaos terrain – Irregular groups of large blocks of rock
- Outburst flood – High-magnitude, low-frequency catastrophic flood involving the sudden release of water
- Outflow channels – Long, wide swathes of scoured ground on Mars
