= Borealis Basin =

Large basin in the northern hemisphere of Mars

- The Borealis Basin is the large blue and green region lying north of the equator. Volcanic eruptions on the Tharsis bulge, the higher elevation region on the left of the image, covered over parts of the basin after its formation.
- Location: Northern Hemisphere, Mars
- Coordinates: 67°N 208°E
- Diameter: c. 10,600 km
- Impactor diameter: c. 1,900 km
- Age: c. 4.5 billion years

The North Polar Basin, more commonly known as the Borealis Basin, is a large basin in the northern hemisphere of Mars that covers 40% of the planet. Some scientists have postulated that the basin formed during the impact of a single, large body roughly 2% of the mass of Mars, having a diameter of about 1,900 km (1,200 miles) early in the history of Mars, around 4.5 billion years ago. However, the basin is not currently recognized as an impact basin by the IAU. The basin is one of the flattest areas in the Solar System, and has an elliptical shape.

== Large regions within the Borealis Basin ==
Because the Borealis Basin covers 40% of the surface of Mars, and much of the Northern Hemisphere, many currently recognized regions of Mars lie within it:

- Acidalia Planitia
- Arcadia Planitia
- Planum Boreum
- Utopia Planitia
- Vastitas Borealis

== Borealis impact ==
=== Formation of the Borealis Basin ===
One possible explanation for the basin's low, flat and relatively crater-free topography is that the basin was formed by a single large impact. Two simulations of a possible impact sketched a profile for the collision: low velocity—6 to 10 km (3.7 to 6.2 mi) per second—oblique angle and a diameter of 1,600–2,700 km (990–1,680 mi). Topographical data from Mars Global Surveyor are consistent with the models and also suggest that the elliptical crater has axes of length 10,600 km (6,600 mi) and 8,500 km (5,300 mi), centered on 67°N 208°E, though this has been partially obscured by later volcanic eruptions that created the Tharsis bulge along its rim. There is evidence for a secondary rim as well. This would make the North Polar Basin by far the largest impact crater in the Solar System, approximately four times the diameter of the next largest craters: Utopia Planitia, which is imbedded inside the North Polar Basin, the South Pole–Aitken basin on The Moon, and Hellas Planitia on Mars's southern hemisphere.

This impact would have resulted in significant crustal melting and a general increase in the rate of crustal formation for a period of 40 million years following the impact. Such a large impact would have disturbed the mantle, altering the normal convection currents and causing upwellings which further increase the amount of melting at the impact site. Overall, such an event would actually increase the rate of cooling of the Martian interior. The lack of magnetic anomalies observed in the northern hemisphere could be explained by such an impact, as the shock waves produced might have demagnetized the crust.

However, some authors have instead argued that the inverse is more likely to be true, and that rather than the North Polar Basin being an impact basin, the Southern Hemisphere of Mars may have actually been the site of the impact instead, and the thickness of the Southern Hemisphere crust was as a result of impact-induced crust production.

=== Potential formation of Phobos and Deimos via Borealis impact ===
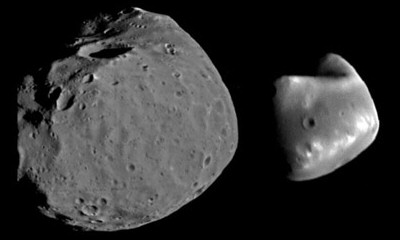
The moons of Mars, Phobos and Deimos. Phobos is the larger of the two moons, and is the closer of the two to Mars. Phobos has an average radius of 11 km, while Deimos has an average radius of 6 km.

The origin of Mars's moons, Phobos and Deimos (pictured right), is unknown and remains controversial. One theory is that the moons are captured asteroids. However, the moons' near circular orbits and low inclination relative to the Martian equator are not in agreement with the capture hypothesis. The detection of minerals on Phobos similar to those in the Martian lithosphere, and the unusually low density and high porosity of Phobos, such that the moon would not be expected to remain aggregate if dynamically captured, suggest that the moons could have formed via accretion in Martian orbit, similarly to how Earth's Moon formed.

While estimates of the mass ejected by a large, Borealis-size impact vary, simulations suggest that a body approximately 0.02 Mars masses (~0.002 Earth Masses) in size is capable of producing a sizable debris disk in Martian orbit, on the order of 5×10^{20} kg, with a significant fraction of the material remaining close to Mars. This figure lies within the estimated mass range necessary to form the two moons, as other data suggests that only 1% of the mass of an accretion disk successfully forms moons. There are several other large impact basins on Mars that could have ejected enough debris to form the moons.

== Ancient tsunamis ==
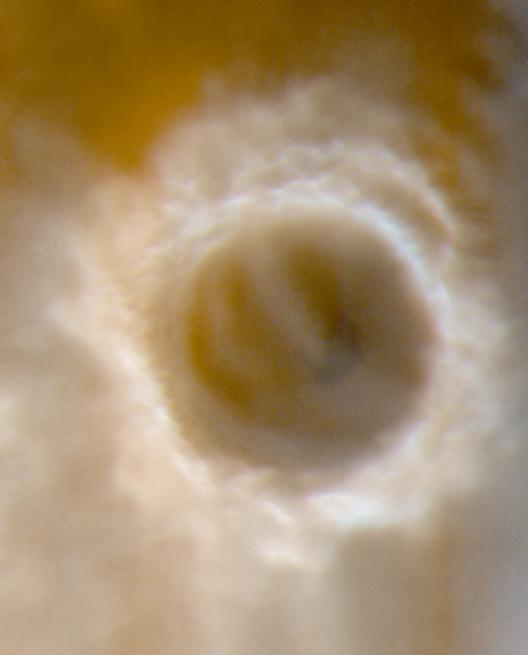
Lomonosov crater, the most likely candidate for the impact that produced the tsunami. It is 150 km in diameter, and is a prominent feature of the Borealis basin.

Analysis of Mars Global Surveyor data found mineral deposits similar to terminal moraines on Earth along the southern rim of the northern lowlands. Scientists have developed several theories to explain their presence, including: volcanic activity, glacial activity, and a series of Martian tsunamis. The arrangement of the deposits resembles deposits observed in recent tsunami events on Earth, and other features of the deposits are inconsistent with the volcanic and glacial hypotheses. One recent investigation identified three impact craters in Acidalia Planitia as being the likely source of the hypothetical tsunamis, with the Lomonosov crater (pictured right) being the most likely candidate. Here, the tsunami generated by the impactor would have reached heights of 75 m (250 ft), and traveled 150 km (90 mi) past the southern rim. Dating techniques put the origin of the deposits sometime between the Late Hesperian and Early Amazonian periods, some 3 billion years ago, providing evidence to the presence of an ocean during this period.

== See also ==
- Arctic Basin (Earth's "North Polar Basin")
- Mars ocean hypothesis (Oceanus Borealis)
- Planum Boreum
- Utopia Planitia
- Vastitas Borealis
