= Acidalia Planitia =

Planitia on Mars

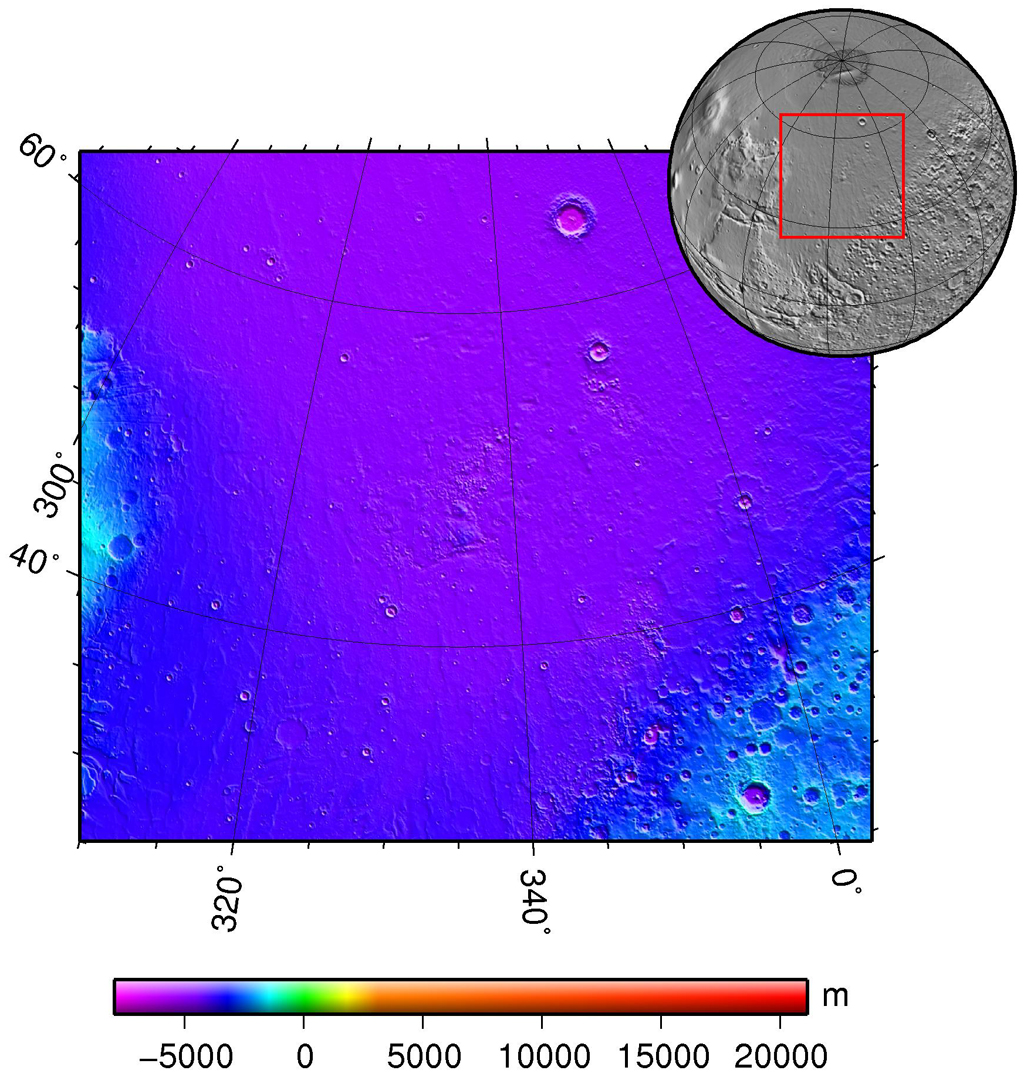
- Topographic map of Acidalia Planitia
- Feature type: Plains
- Coordinates: 49.76°N 339.26°E
- Diameter: 3362.97 km

Acidalia Planitia is a plain on Mars, between the Tharsis volcanic province and Arabia Terra to the north of Valles Marineris, centered at 49.8°N 339.3°E. Most of this region is found in the Mare Acidalium quadrangle, but a small part is in the Ismenius Lacus quadrangle. The plain contains the famous Cydonia region at the contact with the heavily cratered highland terrain.

The plain is named after a corresponding albedo feature on a map by Giovanni Schiaparelli, which was in turn named after the mythological fountain of Acidalia. Some places in Acidalia Planitia show cones, which some researchers have suggested are mud volcanoes. The scientific community is divided over whether an ancient ocean existed on the plain and other parts of the northern lowlands.

== Geological history ==
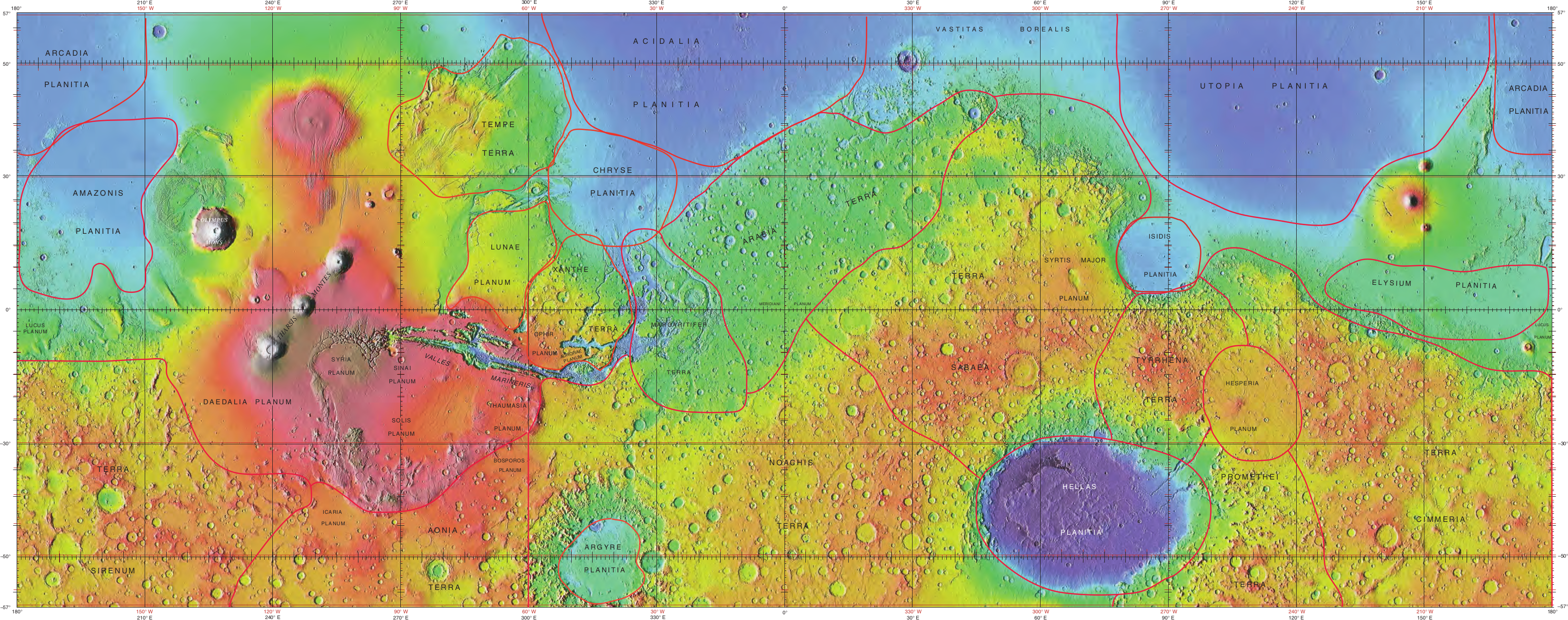
Topographical map generated from MOLA data including feature boundaries. Acidalia Planitia is the central, northernmost feature characterized by dark blue, low elevation land.

There are several hypotheses regarding the geological history of Acidalia Planitia based on evidence from satellite data.

=== Springs and steam vents ===
Acidalia Planitia was once covered by ancient crust. Its surface eroded into knobs of iron/magnesium phyllosilicates during the Amazonian. Sediments filled the empty plain, leaving the phyllosilicate knobs as protrusions through the surface. The spatial density of these knobs is consistent with the ancient crust that was once above Acidalia Planitia.

Hydrated silica materials surround the phyllosilicate knobs and the sides of rocky slopes. Rather than covering the entire surface, these features are localized. This indicates that the plain was once home to springs and steam vents not extensive bodies of water such as oceans or glaciers.

=== Oceans ===
Utopia Planitia is a similar plain at the same latitude as Acidalia Planitia. Etched flows in its terrain suggest that mud flowed into Utopia Planitia creating a large reservoir of water and mud in the deepest part of the basin, about 1000 km across. This may have been the remnants of a more extensive ocean that covered all of the northern lowlands including Acidalia Planitia. The Vastitas Borealis Formation (VBF) stretched across both Utopia and Acidalia Planitiae and delineated the threshold for an ancient ocean. The two segments of the VBF at Utopia and Acidalia have congruent ages, reliefs, crater frequencies, albedos, thermal properties, and superpositions of geological features. This suggests that the Acidalia Planitia may have once been covered by a large Martian ocean.

=== Glaciers ===
Craters on Acidalia Planitia are asymmetrical. Mars Orbital Laser Altimeter (MOLA) data revealed that the slopes of the pole-facing crater walls are shallower than the equator-facing slopes. Other studies show the opposite asymmetry to be true. The two theories indicate either biased glacial deposition during the Amazonian era or long-term creep of hundreds of meters of ice-rich regolith beneath the surface, respectively.

== Geological features ==
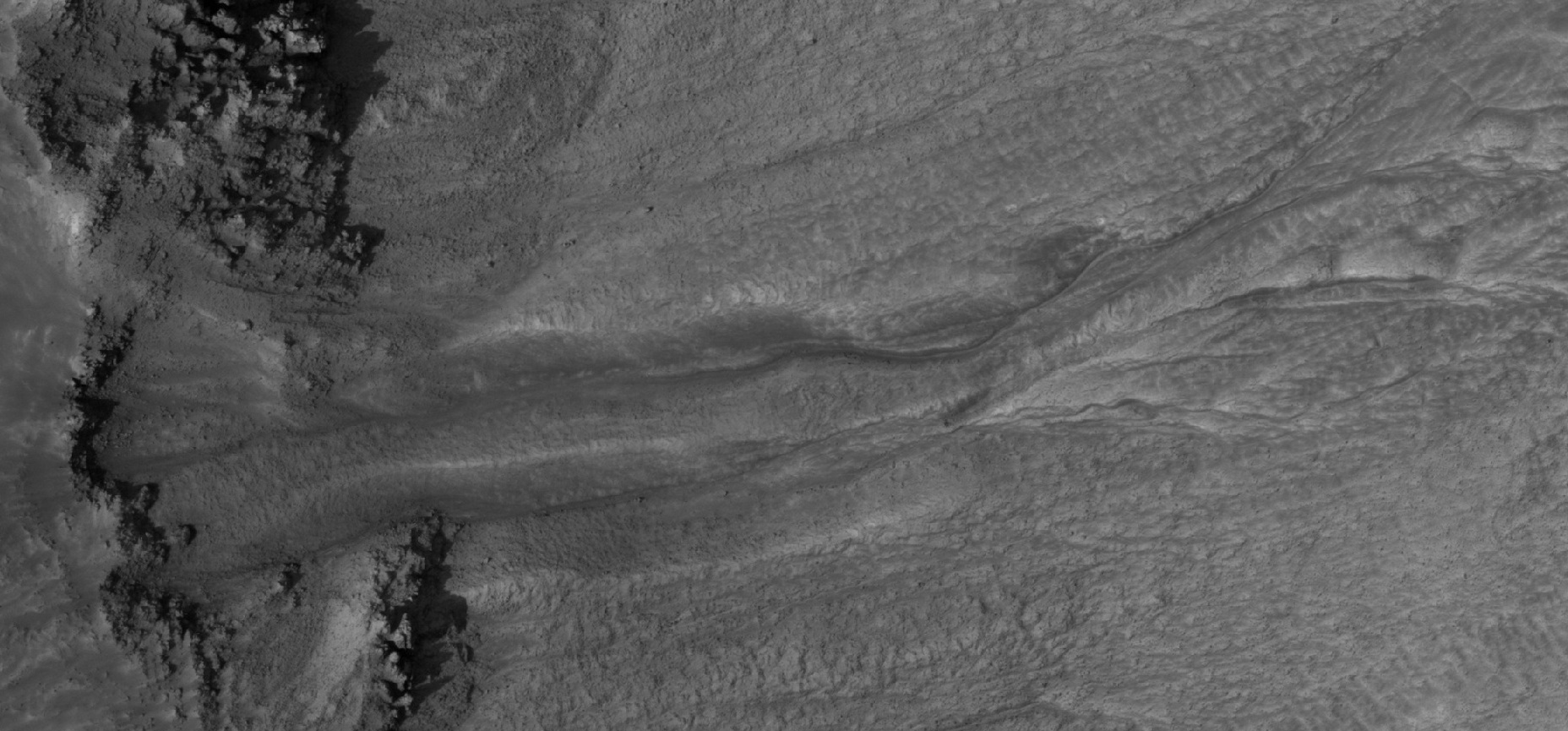
A gully found in the Bamberg Crater, which resides in Acidalia Planitia

=== Gullies ===
Martian gullies are small, incised networks of narrow channels and their associated downslope sediment deposits, found on the planet of Mars. They are named for their resemblance to terrestrial gullies. First discovered on images from Mars Global Surveyor, they occur on steep slopes, especially on the walls of craters. Usually, each gully has a dendritic alcove at its head, a fan-shaped apron at its base, and a single thread of incised channel linking the two, giving the whole gully an hourglass shape. They are believed to be relatively young because they have few, if any craters. A subclass of gullies is also found cut into the faces of sand dunes which are themselves considered to be quite young. On the basis of their form, aspects, positions, and location amongst and apparent interaction with features thought to be rich in water ice, many researchers believed that the processes carving the gullies involve liquid water. However, this remains a topic of active research.

=== Mud volcanoes ===
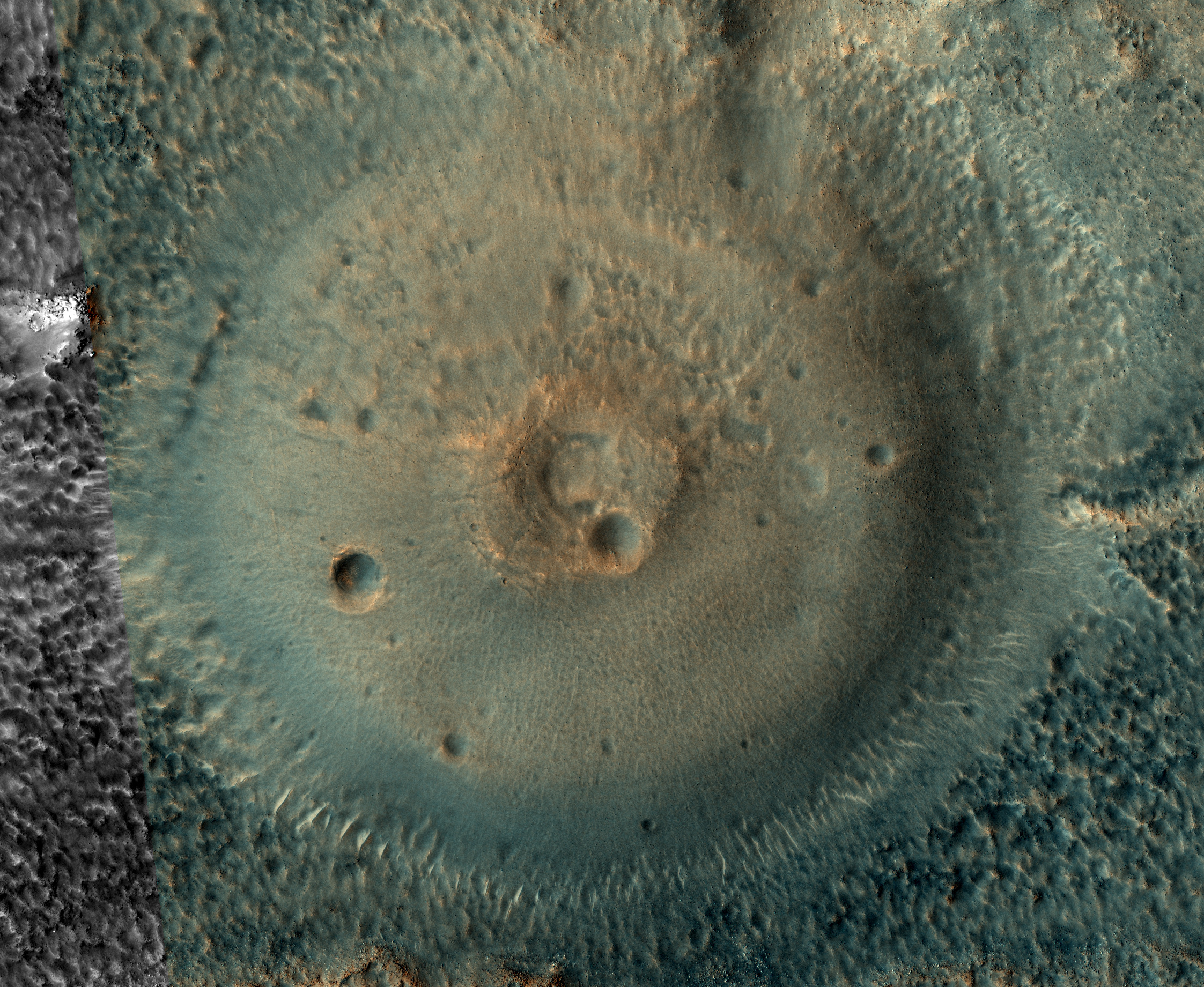
Possible mud volcano in Acidalia Planitia

Cone-shaped features with higher albedo than surrounding rocks litter the surface of Acidalia Planitia. The most similar terrestrial feature to these formations are mud volcanoes. On Mars, mud volcanoes have an average diameter of ~1 km and a relief of 10 to 180 meters. Their higher albedo is a result of more crystalline iron oxides than the rest of Acidalia Planitia. Mud volcanoes erupt sediments from deep beneath the surface and change the rising rocks very minimally. These rocks are used to analyze organic matter as mud volcanoes also create subterranean conduits for ancient ground water that may have hosted microbiota.

== In popular culture ==
In the 2011 novel The Martian by Andy Weir, and its 2015 film adaptation, Acidalia Planitia is the landing site of the Ares III mission, where the protagonist is stranded following a dust storm.

== See also ==
- Geography of Mars
- List of plains on Mars
- Martian Gullies
- Martian North Polar Basin
