= Mars ocean hypothesis =

Astronomical hypothesis

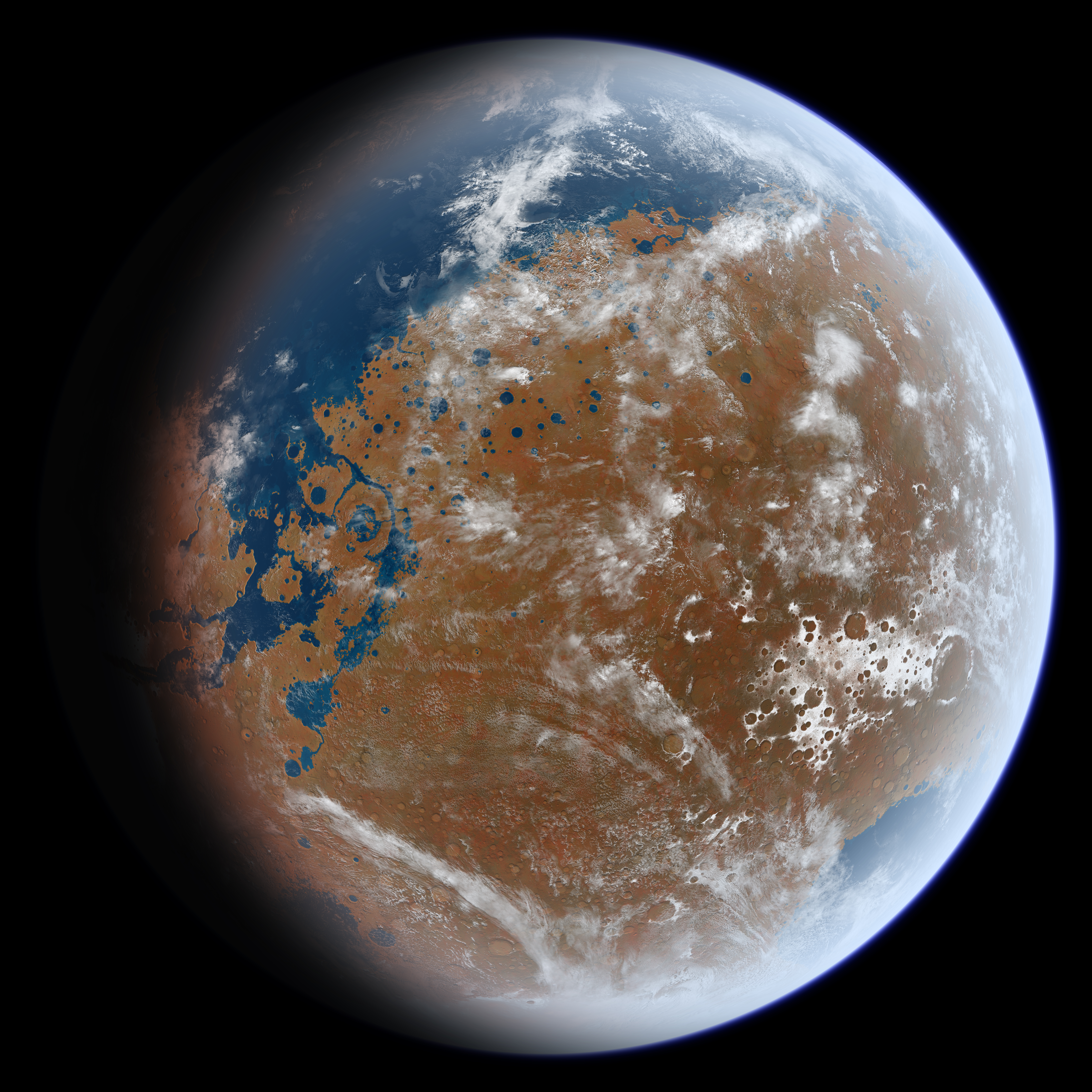
An artist's impression of ancient Mars and its oceans based on geological data

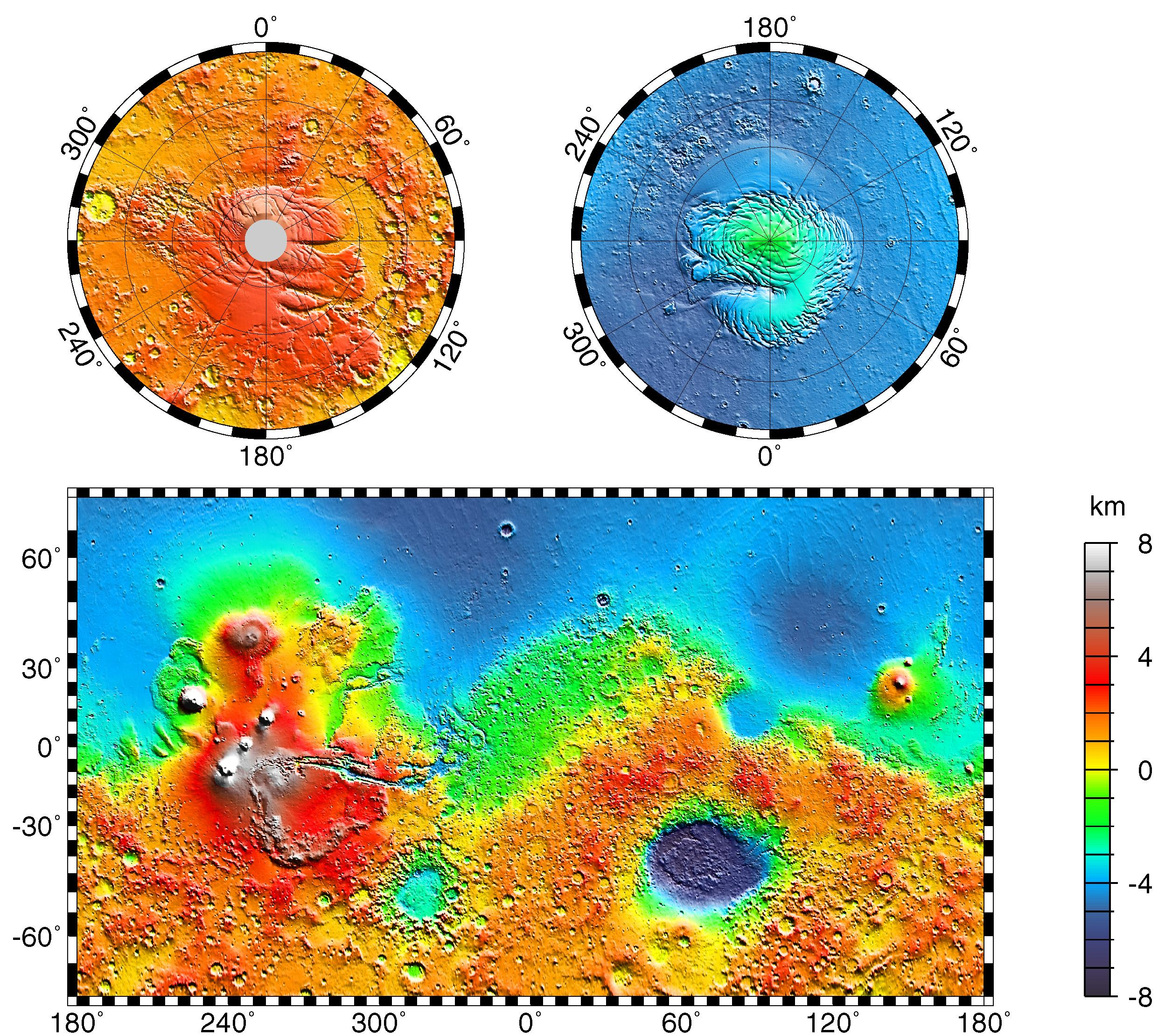
The blue region of low topography in the Martian northern hemisphere is hypothesized to be the site of a primordial ocean of liquid water.

The Mars ocean hypothesis states that nearly a third of the surface of Mars was covered by an ocean of liquid water early in the planet's geologic history. This primordial ocean, dubbed Paleo-Ocean or Oceanus Borealis (/oʊˈsiːənəs ˌbɒriˈælɪs/ oh-SEE-ə-nəs BORR-ee-AL-iss), would have filled the low-lying Vastitas Borealis basin in the northern hemisphere, a region that lies 4–5 km (2.5–3.1 mi) below the mean planetary elevation, at a time period of approximately 4.1–3.8 billion years ago. Evidence for this ocean includes geographic features resembling ancient shorelines, and the chemical properties of the Martian soil and atmosphere. Early Mars would have required a denser atmosphere and warmer climate to allow liquid water to remain at the surface.

== History of observational evidence ==
Images obtained by the Viking orbiters in 1976 revealed two possible ancient shorelines near the pole, Arabia and Deuteronilus, each thousands of kilometers long. Several physical features in the present geography of Mars suggest the past existence of a primordial ocean. Networks of gullies that merge into larger channels imply erosion by a liquid agent, and resemble ancient riverbeds on Earth. Enormous channels, 25 km wide and several hundred meters deep, appear to direct flow from underground aquifers in the Southern uplands into the Northern lowlands. Much of the northern hemisphere of Mars is located at a significantly lower elevation than the rest of the planet (the Martian dichotomy), and is unusually flat.

These observations led a number of researchers to look for remnants of more ancient coastlines and further raised the possibility that such an ocean once existed. In 1987, John E. Brandenburg published the hypothesis of a primordial Mars ocean he dubbed Paleo-Ocean. The ocean hypothesis is important because the existence of large bodies of liquid water in the past would have had a significant impact on ancient Martian climate, habitability potential and implications for the search for evidence of past life on Mars.

Beginning in 1998, scientists Michael Malin and Kenneth Edgett set out to investigate with higher-resolution cameras on board the Mars Global Surveyor with a resolution five to ten times better than those of the Viking spacecraft, in places that would test shorelines proposed by others in the scientific literature. Their analyses were inconclusive at best, and reported that the shoreline varies in elevation by several kilometers, rising and falling from one peak to the next for thousands of kilometers. These trends cast doubt on whether the features truly mark a long-gone sea coast and, have been taken as an argument against the Martian shoreline (and ocean) hypothesis.

The Mars Orbiter Laser Altimeter (MOLA), which accurately determined in 1999 the altitude of all parts of Mars, found that the watershed for an ocean on Mars would cover three-quarters of the planet. The unique distribution of crater types below 2400 m elevation in the Vastitas Borealis was studied in 2005. The researchers suggest that erosion involved significant amounts of sublimation, and an ancient ocean at that location would have encompassed a volume of 6 × 10^{7} km^{3}.

In 2007, Taylor Perron and Michael Manga proposed a geophysical model that, after adjustment for true polar wander caused by mass redistributions from volcanism, the Martian paleo-shorelines first proposed in 1987 by John E. Brandenburg, meet this criterion. The model indicates that these undulating Martian shorelines can be explained by the movement of Mars's rotation axis. Because centrifugal force causes spinning objects and large rotating objects to bulge at their equator (equatorial bulge), the polar wander could have caused the shoreline elevation to shift in a similar way as observed. Their model does not attempt to explain what caused Mars's rotation axis to move relative to the crust.

Research published in 2009 shows a much higher density of stream channels than formerly believed. Regions on Mars with the most valleys are comparable to what is found on the Earth. In the research, the team developed a computer program to identify valleys by searching for U-shaped structures in topographical data. The large amount of valley networks strongly supports rain on the planet in the past. The global pattern of the Martian valleys could be explained with a big northern ocean. A large ocean in the northern hemisphere would explain why there is a southern limit to valley networks; the southernmost regions of Mars, farthest from the water reservoir, would get little rainfall and would develop no valleys. In a similar fashion the lack of rainfall would explain why Martian valleys become shallower from north to south.

A 2010 study of deltas on Mars revealed that seventeen of them are found at the altitude of a proposed shoreline for a Martian ocean. This is what would be expected if the deltas were all next to a large body of water. Research presented at a Planetary Conference in Texas suggested that the Hypanis Valles fan complex is a delta with multiple channels and lobes, which formed at the margin of a large, standing body of water. That body of water was a northern ocean. This delta is at the dichotomy boundary between the northern lowlands and southern highlands near Chryse Planitia.

Research published in 2012 using data from MARSIS, a radar on board the Mars Express orbiter, supports the hypothesis of an extinct large, northern ocean. The instrument revealed a dielectric constant of the surface that is similar to those of low-density sedimentary deposits, massive deposits of ground-ice, or a combination of the two. The measurements were not like those of a lava-rich surface.

In 2026. researchers found that topographic shelves rather than shorelines may be better indicators of long-lived oceans on Mars. On Earth, the most prominent topographic sign of a global ocean is not a shoreline, but a band of low slope and curvature values that comprises coastal plains and the continental shelf, with an elevation range of −410 m to −15 m. Mars also a comparably flat zone between approximately –1,800 m and –3,800 m elevation, potentially marking a partially preserved Martian coastal shelf.

In March 2015, scientists stated that evidence exists for an ancient volume of water that could comprise an ocean, likely in the planet's northern hemisphere and about the size of Earth's Arctic Ocean. This finding was derived from the ratio of water and deuterium in the modern Martian atmosphere compared to the ratio found on Earth and derived from telescopic observations. Eight times as much deuterium was inferred at the polar deposits of Mars than exists on Earth (VSMOW), suggesting that ancient Mars had significantly higher levels of water. The representative atmospheric value obtained from the maps (7 VSMOW) is not affected by climatological effects as those measured by localized rovers, although the telescopic measurements are within range to the enrichment measured by the Curiosity rover in Gale Crater of 5–7 VSMOW. Even back in 2001, a study of the ratio of molecular hydrogen to deuterium in the upper atmosphere of Mars by the NASA Far Ultraviolet Spectroscopic Explorer spacecraft suggested an abundant water supply on primordial Mars. Further evidence that Mars once had a thicker atmosphere which would make an ocean more probable came from the MAVEN spacecraft that has been making measurements from Mars orbit. Bruce Jakosky, lead author of a paper published in Science, stated that "We've determined that most of the gas ever present in the Mars atmosphere has been lost to space." This research was based upon two different isotopes of argon gas.

For how long this body of water was in the liquid form is still unknown, considering the high greenhouse efficiency required to bring water to the liquid phase in Mars at a heliocentric distance of 1.4–1.7 AU. It is now thought that the canyons filled with water, and at the end of the Noachian Period the Martian ocean disappeared, and the surface froze for approximately 450 million years. Then, about 3.2 billion years ago, lava beneath the canyons heated the soil, melted the icy materials, and produced vast systems of subterranean rivers extending hundreds of kilometers. This water erupted onto the now-dry surface in giant floods.

New evidence for a vast northern ocean was published in May 2016. A large team of scientists described how some of the surface in Ismenius Lacus quadrangle was altered by two tsunamis. The tsunamis were caused by asteroids striking the ocean. Both were thought to have been strong enough to create 30 km diameter craters. The first tsunami picked up and carried boulders the size of cars or small houses. The backwash from the wave formed channels by rearranging the boulders. The second came in when the ocean was 300 m lower. The second carried a great deal of ice which was dropped in valleys. Calculations show that the average height of the waves would have been 50 m, but the heights would vary from 10 m to 120 m. Numerical simulations show that in this particular part of the ocean two impact craters of the size of 30 km in diameter would form every 30 million years. The implication here is that a great northern ocean may have existed for millions of years. One argument against an ocean has been the lack of shoreline features. These features may have been washed away by these tsunami events. The parts of Mars studied in this research are Chryse Planitia and northwestern Arabia Terra. These tsunamis affected some surfaces in the Ismenius Lacus quadrangle and in the Mare Acidalium quadrangle. The impact that created the crater Lomonosov has been identified as a likely source of tsunami waves.

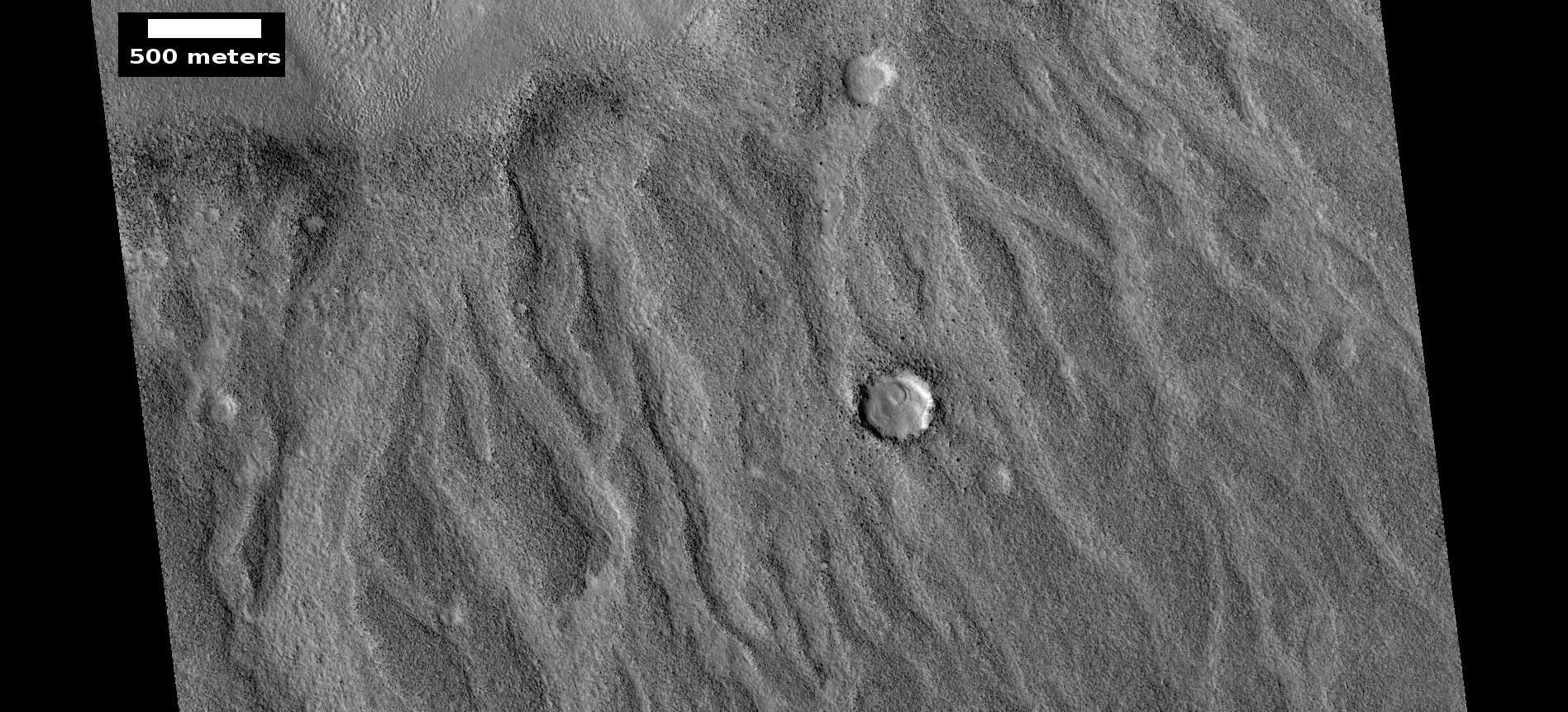
Channels made by the backwash from tsunamis, as seen by HiRISE. The tsunamis were probably caused by asteroids striking the ocean.

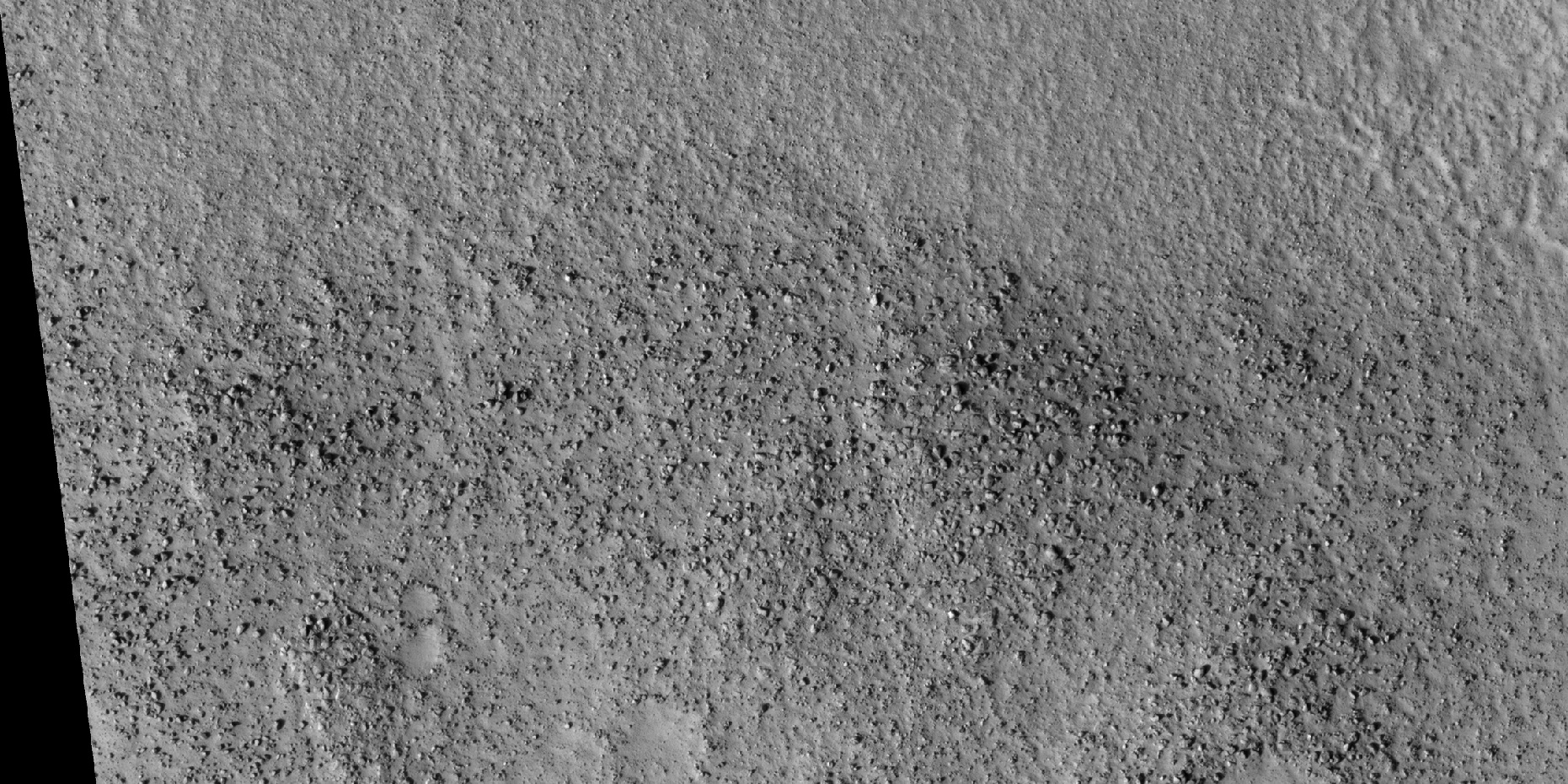
Boulders that were picked up, carried, and dropped by tsunamis, as seen by HiRISE. The boulders are between the size of cars and houses.

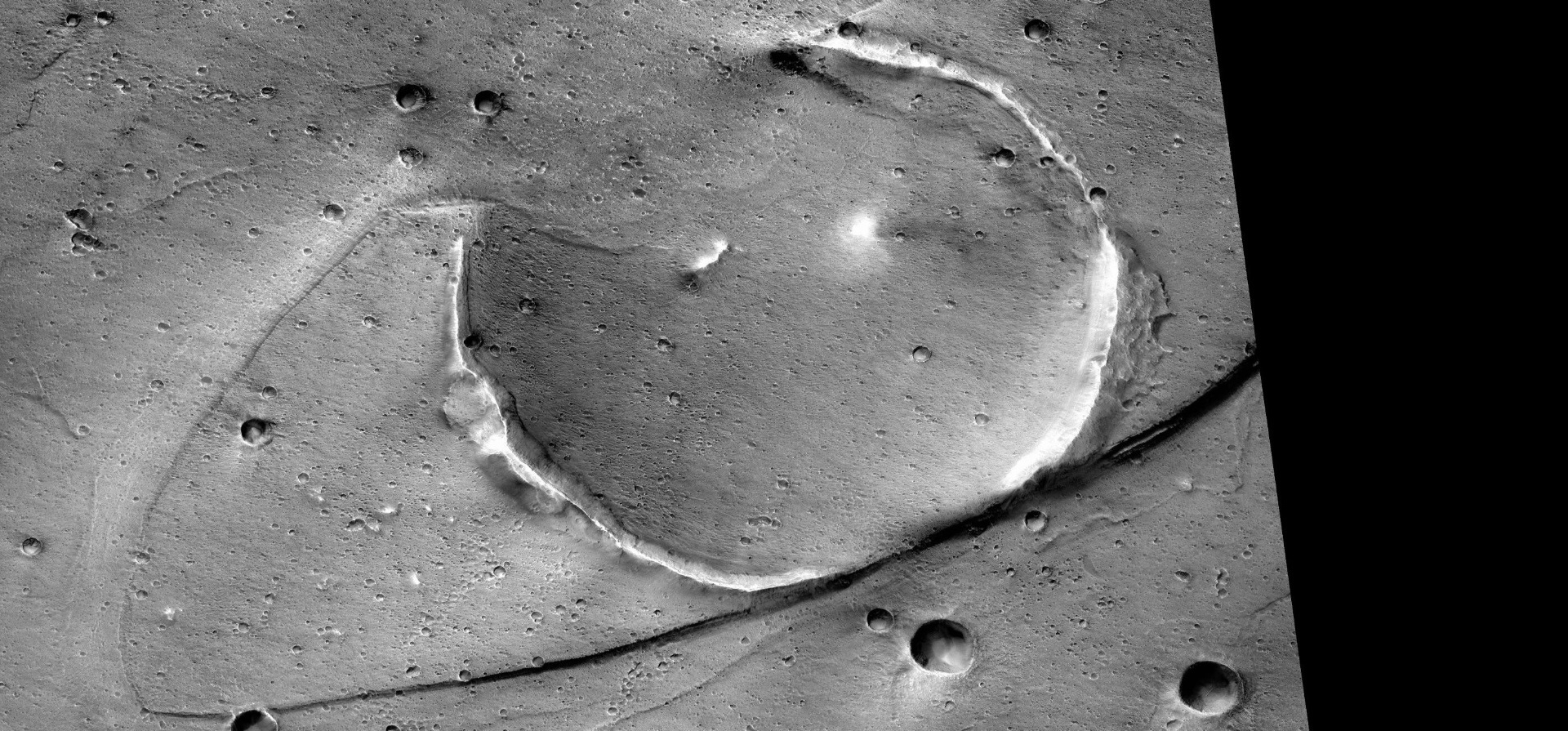
Streamlined promontory eroded by tsunami, as seen by HiRISE.

Research reported in 2017 found that the amount of water needed to develop valley networks, outflow channels, and delta deposits of Mars was larger than the volume of a Martian ocean. The estimated volume of an ocean on Mars ranges from 3 meters to about 2 kilometers GEL (Global equivalent layer). This implies that a large amount of water was available on Mars.

This artist's impression released by the European Southern Observatory (ESO) in 2015 shows how Mars may have looked like about four billion years ago.

In 2018, a team of scientists proposed that Martian oceans appeared very early, before or along with the growth of Tharsis. Because of this the depth of the oceans would be only half as deep as had been thought. The full weight of Tharsis would have created deep basins, but if the ocean occurred before the mass of Tharsis had formed deep basins, much less water would be needed. Also, the shorelines would not be regular since Tharsis would still be growing and consequently changing the depth of the ocean's basin. As Tharsis volcanoes erupted they added huge amounts of gases into the atmosphere that created a global warming, thereby allowing liquid water to exist.

In July 2019, support was reported for an ancient ocean on Mars that may have been formed by a possible mega-tsunami source resulting from a meteorite impact creating Lomonosov crater.

In January 2022, a study about the climate 3 billion years ago on Mars shows that an ocean is stable with a water cycle that is closed. They estimate a return water flow, in form of ice in glacier, from the icy highlands to the ocean is in magnitude less than the Earth at the last glacial maximum. This simulation includes for the first time a circulation of the ocean. They demonstrate that the ocean's circulation prevent the ocean to freeze. These also shows that simulations are in agreement with observed geomorphological features identified as ancient glacial valleys.

In a paper published by the Journal of Geophysical Research: Planets in 2022, Benjamin T. Cardenas and Michael P. Lamb asserted that evidence of accumulated sediment suggests Mars had a large, northern ocean in the distant past.

In a study, published in January 2026, a group of researches found some boundaries of a northern ocean in Valles Marineris. They determined where the sea level was by studying fans. These fans look like river deltas on Earth. They represent the mouth of a river into an ocean. So, the ancient ocean that was located in the North, and according to this study, extended all the way to the Valles Marineris.

== Issues ==
=== Primordial Martian climate ===
The existence of liquid water on the surface of Mars requires both a warmer and thicker atmosphere. Atmospheric pressure on the present-day Martian surface only exceeds that of the triple point of water (6.11 hPa) in the lowest elevations; at higher elevations pure water can exist only as a solid or a vapor. Annual mean temperatures at the surface are currently less than 210 K (−63 °C; −82 °F), significantly less than what is needed to sustain liquid water. However, early in its history Mars may have had conditions more conducive to retaining liquid water at the surface.

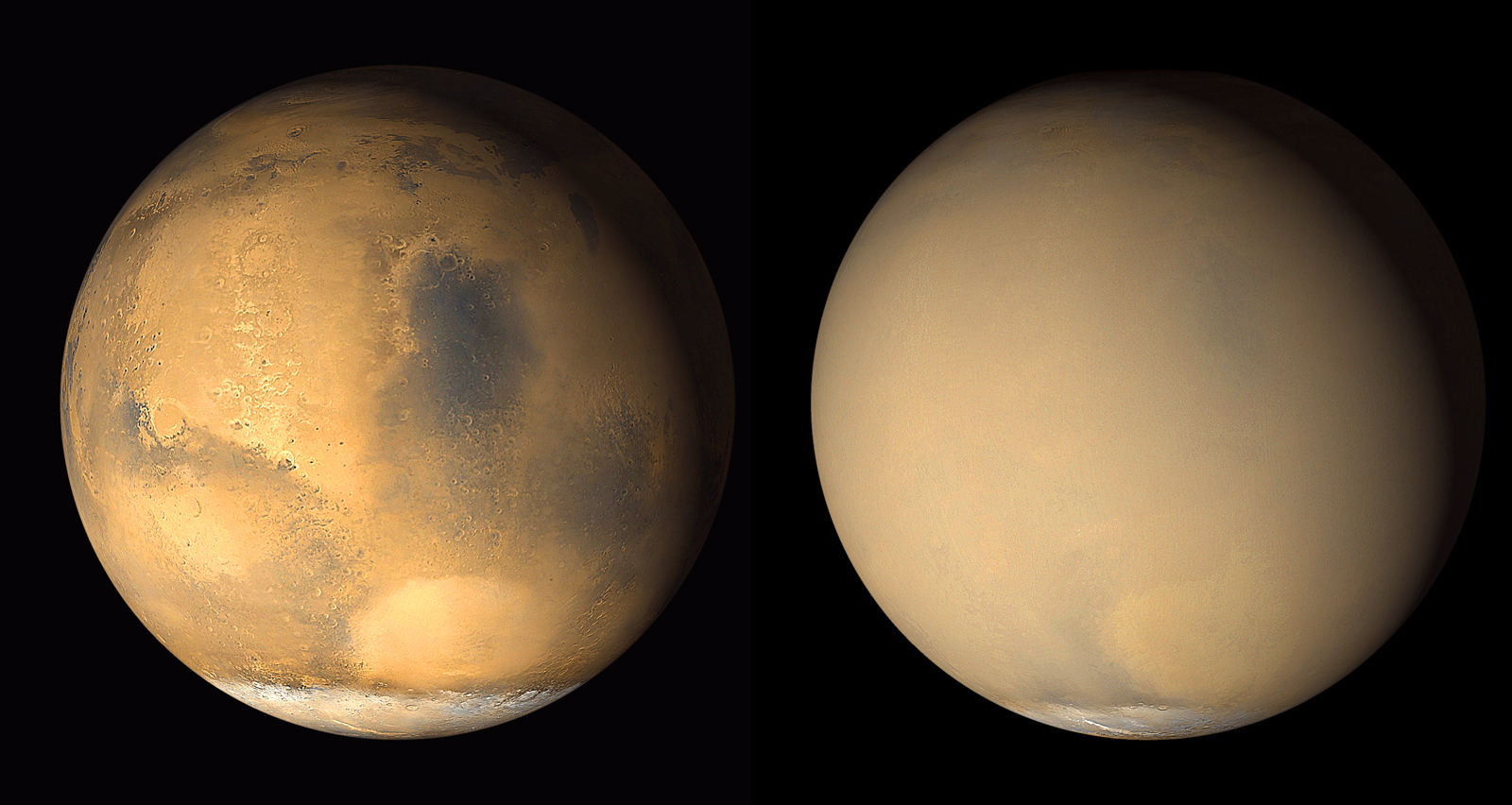
Mars without a dust storm in June 2001 (on left) and with a global dust storm in July 2001 (on right), as seen by Mars Global Surveyor

Early Mars had a carbon dioxide atmosphere similar in thickness to present-day Earth (1000 hPa). Despite a weak early Sun, the greenhouse effect from a thick carbon dioxide atmosphere, if bolstered with small amounts of methane or insulating effects of carbon-dioxide-ice clouds, would have been sufficient to warm the mean surface temperature to a value above the freezing point of water. The atmosphere has since been reduced by sequestration in the ground in the form of carbonates through weathering, as well as loss to space through sputtering (an interaction with the solar wind due to the lack of a strong Martian magnetosphere). A study of dust storms with the Mars Reconnaissance Orbiter suggested that 10 percent of the water loss from Mars may have been caused by dust storms. It was observed that dust storms can carry water vapor to very high altitudes. Ultraviolet light from the Sun can then break the water apart in a process called photodissociation. The hydrogen from the water molecule then escapes into space.

The obliquity (axial tilt) of Mars varies considerably on geologic timescales, and has a strong impact on planetary climate conditions. The study by Schmidt et al. in 2022 shows that the circulation of the ocean tends to minimize the effect of obliquity. In other words, a circulating ocean will transport heat from the hottest region to the coldest ones (usually mid-latitude to the pole) in order to cancel the effect of obliquity.

=== Chemistry ===
Consideration of chemistry can yield additional insight into the properties of Oceanus Borealis. With a Martian atmosphere of predominantly carbon dioxide, one might expect to find extensive evidence of carbonate minerals on the surface as remnants from oceanic sedimentation. An abundance of carbonates has yet to be detected by the Mars space missions. However, if the early oceans were acidic, carbonates would not have been able to form. The positive correlation of phosphorus, sulfur, and chlorine in the soil at two landing sites suggest mixing in a large acidic reservoir. Hematite deposits detected by TES have also been argued as evidence of past liquid water.

Manganese oxides can act as a marker for past oceans, especially around water-air boundaries. Manganese minerals react with oxygen. In oxygen-poor water, manganese remains in its dissolved, soluble form, but when oxygen becomes available it is oxidized into insoluble solid oxides, which can become signatures of water activity. In 2026, a large research team published a study that showed a sort of "bathtub ring" in parts of Utopia. This was interpreted as manganese oxides deposited by an ocean. The team involved analyzed short-wave infrared (SWIR) data from China's Zhurong rover, ESA's OMEGA orbiter and NASA's CRISM orbiter to map the manganese (hydr)oxides. They estimated that the ocean lasted around 0.8–1.5 million years.

=== Fate of the ocean ===
Given the proposal of a vast primordial ocean on Mars, the fate of the water requires explanation. As the Martian climate cooled, the surface of the ocean would have frozen. One hypothesis states that part of the ocean remains in a frozen state buried beneath a thin layer of rock, debris, and dust on the flat northern plain Vastitas Borealis. The water could have also been absorbed into the subsurface cryosphere or been lost to the atmosphere (by sublimation) and eventually to space through atmospheric sputtering.

Recordings of seismic waves by InSight from deep within the Red Planet indicate that a layer of liquid water may be in the Martian rocks between 3.4 and 5 miles [5.5 and 8.0 kilometres] below the surface. The total volume of hidden water could flood the whole of Mars's surface with an ocean 1,700 to 2,560 feet [520 to 780 metres] deep, around the same volume of liquid that is contained within Antarctica's ice sheet, the study authors estimate. Another group earlier found similar results and suggested the water would be in fractures in igneous rocks. Liquid water in the Martian mid-crust They estimate that there is enough liquid water under the surface to produce water across the surface that would be more than half a mile deep. However, it would be hard to get to as it is 10–20 km deep. The team of researchers used measurements from more than 1,319 quakes to come to their conclusions. Calculations obtained from InSight lander's data suggest up to 2 km global equivalent layer (GEL) could be in the crust.

== Alternate explanations ==
The existence of a primordial Martian ocean remains controversial among scientists. The Mars Reconnaissance Orbiter's High Resolution Imaging Science Experiment (HiRISE) has discovered large boulders on the site of the ancient seabed, which should contain only fine sediment. However, the boulders could have been dropped by icebergs, a process common on Earth. The interpretations of some features as ancient shorelines has been challenged.

A study published in September 2021 comparing potassium isotopes found in rocks from various bodies proposes that the surface gravity on Mars was too low to retain enough water to form a large ocean.

Alternate theories for the creation of surface gullies and channels include wind erosion, liquid carbon dioxide, and liquid methanol.

Confirmation or refutation of the Mars ocean hypothesis awaits additional observational evidence from future Mars missions.

== See also ==
- Extraterrestrial liquid water – Liquid water naturally occurring outside Earth
- Lakes on Mars – Former bodies of water on Mars
- Life on Mars – Assessments of possible life on Mars
- Water on Mars – Study of past and present water on Mars
- Terraforming of Mars – Hypothetical modification of Mars that would include a large northern ocean
