= Lomonosov (Martian crater) =

Martian crater Lomonosov
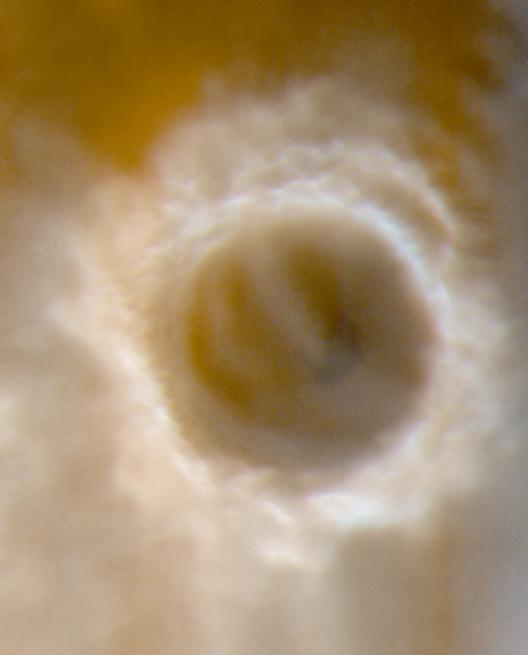
- Planet: Mars
- Coordinates: 64.9°N 9.2°W
- Quadrangle: Mare Acidalium
- Diameter: 150 km
- Eponym: Mikhail V. Lomonosov

Lomonosov is a crater on Mars, with a diameter close to 150 km. It is located in the Martian northern plains. Since it is large and found close (64.9° north) to the boundary between the Mare Acidalium quadrangle and the Mare Boreum quadrangle, it is found on both maps. The topography is smooth and young in this area, hence Lomonosov is easy to spot on large maps of Mars.

The crater was named in 1973 in honour of Mikhail V. Lomonosov.

The impact that created the crater has been identified as a possible source of tsunami waves which washed the shores of an ancient ocean formerly present in the basin Vastitas Borealis. In July 2019, further support was reported for an ancient ocean on Mars that may have been formed by a possible mega-tsunami source resulting from a meteorite impact creating Lomonosov crater.

== Gallery ==
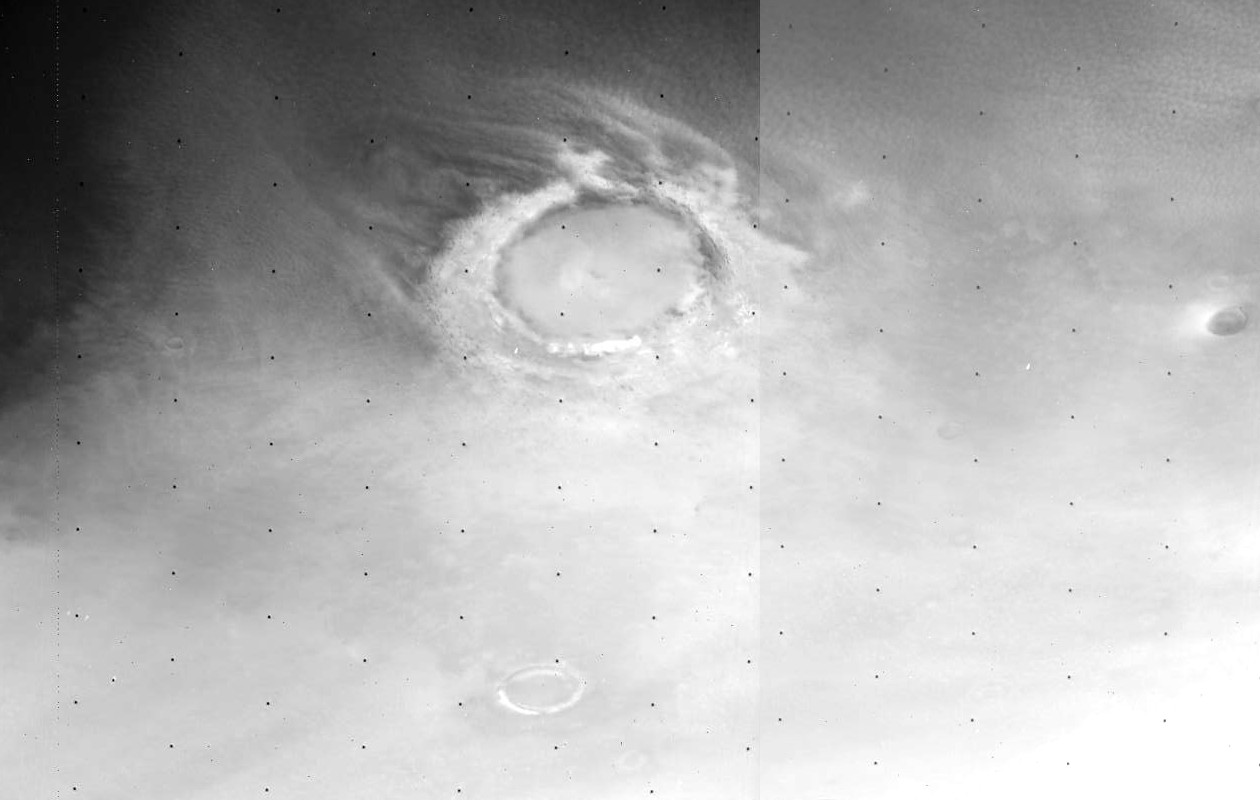
Mosaic of Viking Oribiter 1 images, with Lomonosov at top and looking south.

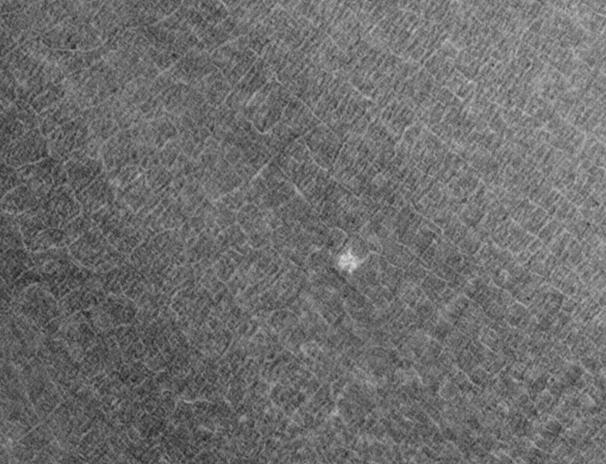
Polygonial patterned ground in the interior of Lomonosov, as seen by Mars Global Surveyor.

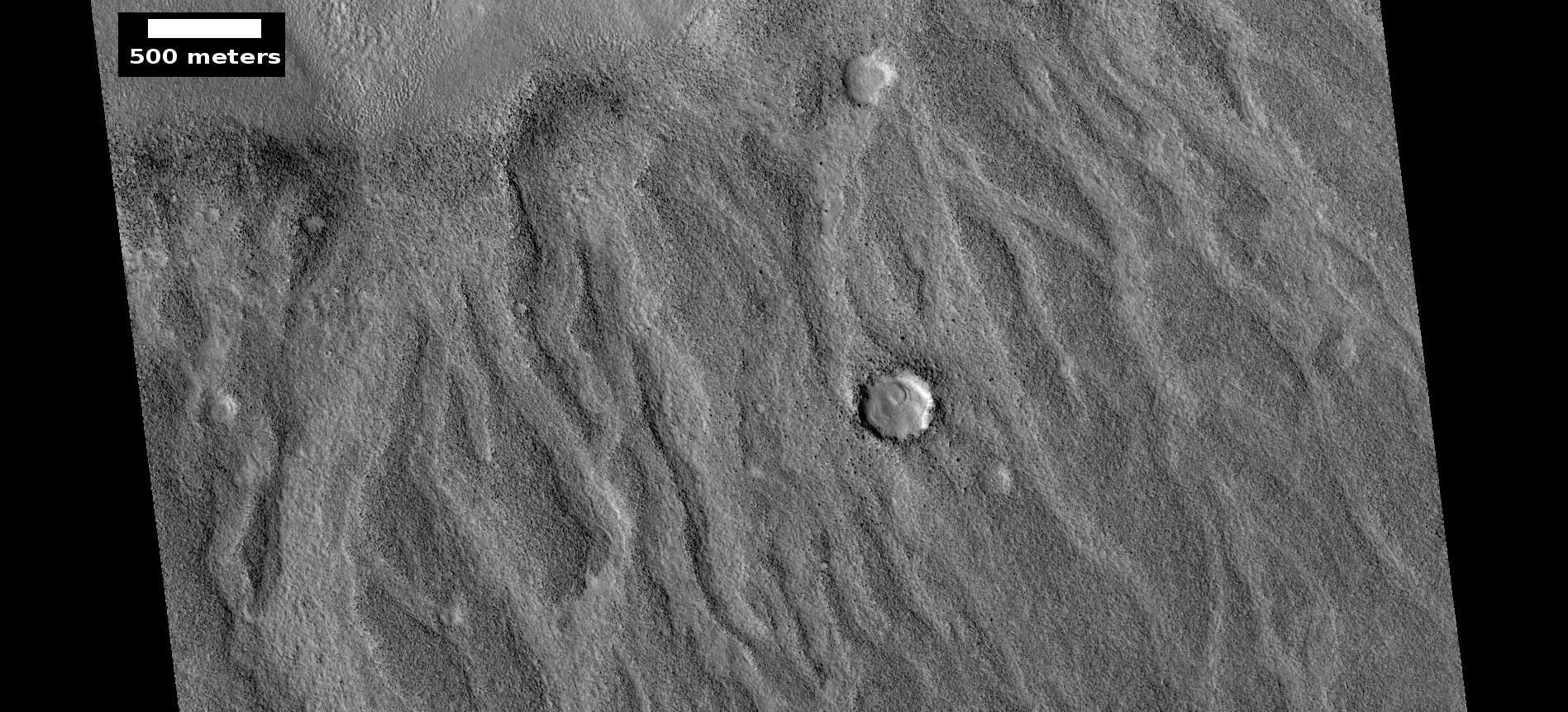
Channels made by the backwash from tsunamis, as seen by HiRISE. Tsunamis were probably caused by asteroids striking the ocean.

== See also ==
- 1379 Lomonosowa, asteroid
