= Mare Acidalium quadrangle =

Map of Mars

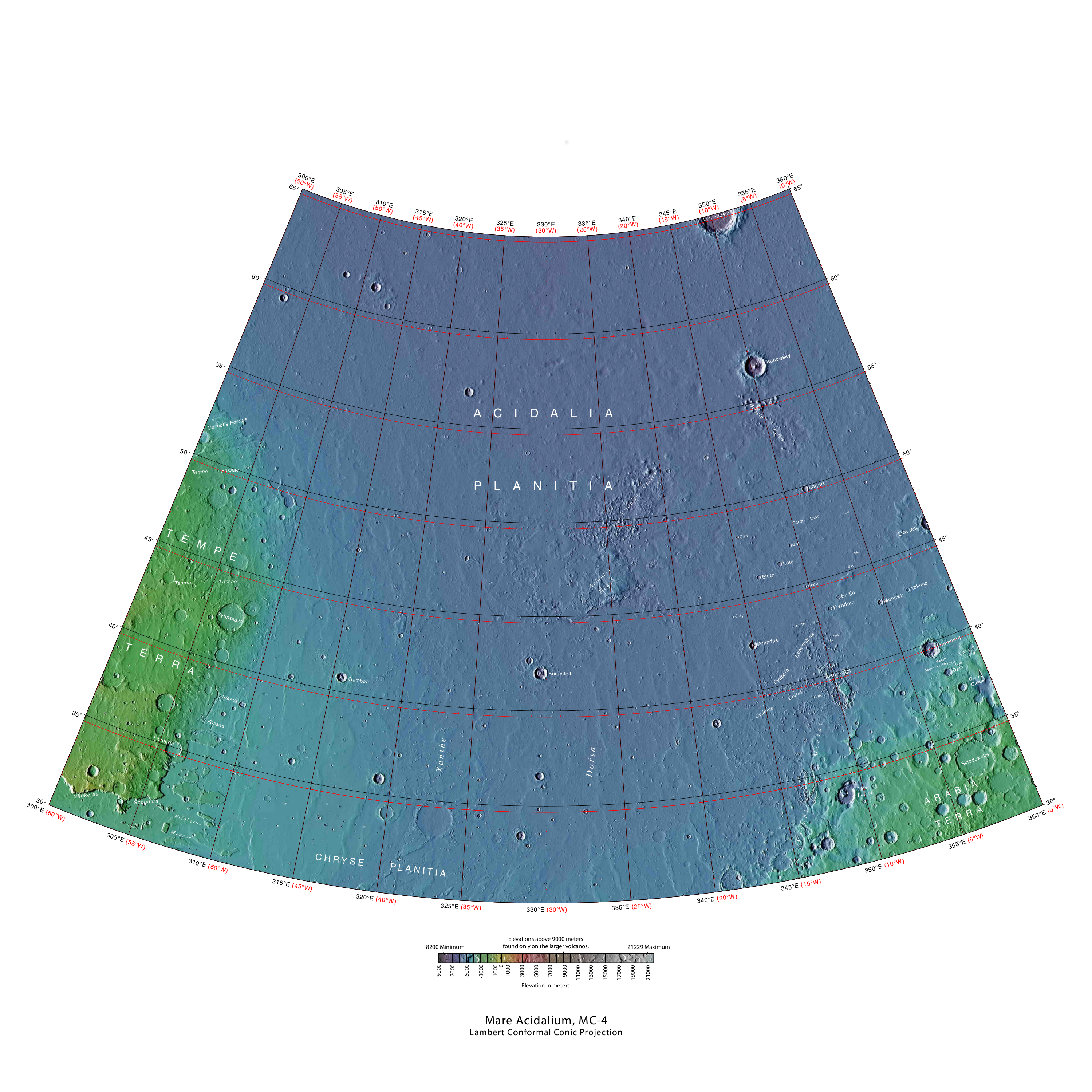
- Elevation map of Mare Acidalium quadrangle from Mars Orbiter Laser Altimeter (MOLA) data
- Coordinates: 47.5°N 30°W

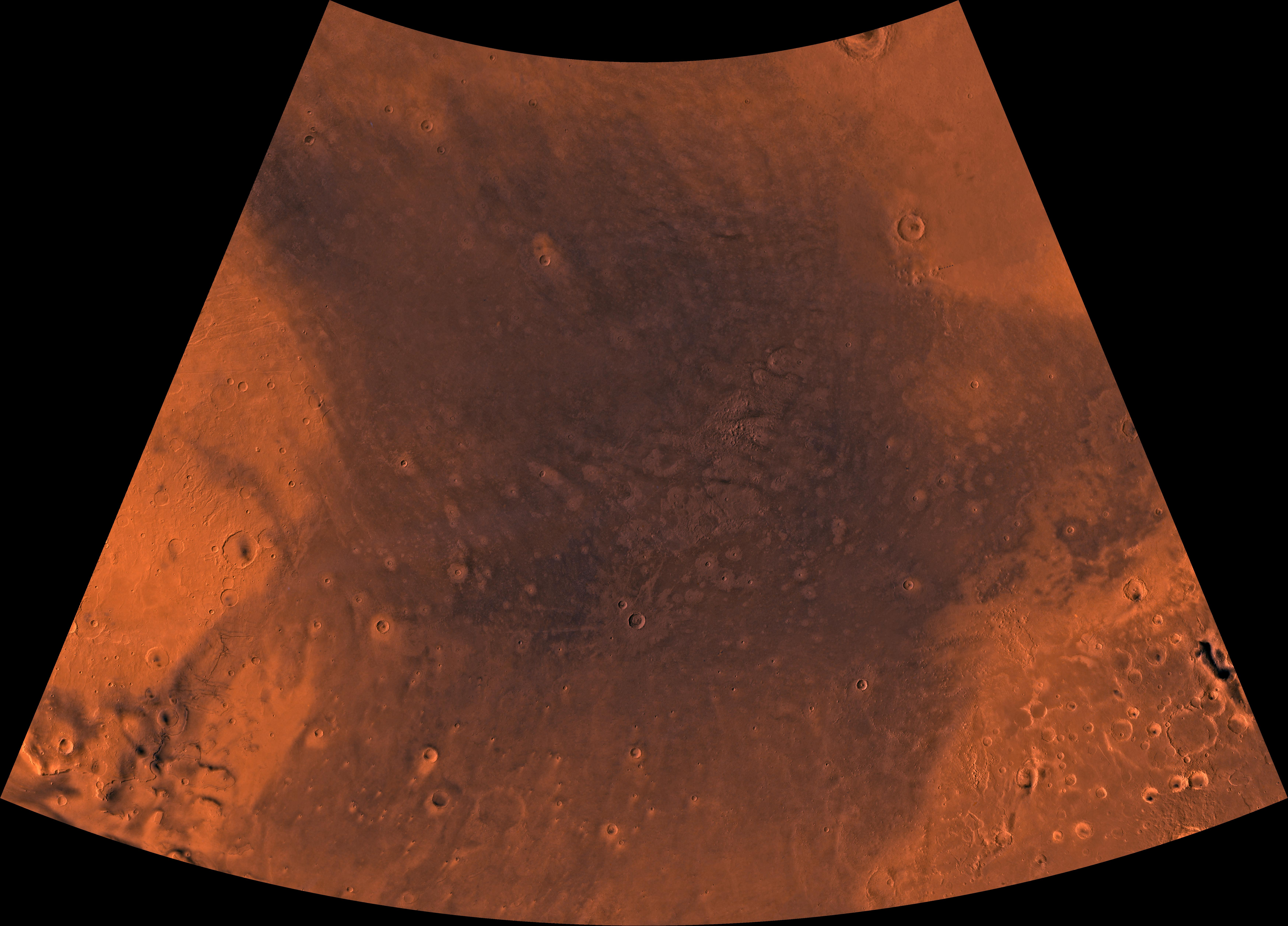
Image of the Mare Acidalium quadrangle (MC-4). The large craters Lomonosov (far upper right) and Kunowsky (upper right) are easily seen. The famous "face" on Mars is located in the Cydonia Mensae area (bottom right).

The Mare Acidalium quadrangle is one of a series of 30 quadrangle maps of Mars used by the United States Geological Survey (USGS) Astrogeology Research Program. The quadrangle is located in the northeastern portion of Mars' western hemisphere and covers 300° to 360° east longitude (0° to 60° west longitude) and 30° to 65° north latitude. The quadrangle uses a Lambert conformal conic projection at a nominal scale of 1:5,000,000 (1:5M). The Mare Acidalium quadrangle is also referred to as MC-4 (Mars Chart-4).

The southern and northern borders of the quadrangle are approximately 3,065 km and 1,500 km wide, respectively. The north to south distance is about 2,050 km (slightly less than the length of Greenland). The quadrangle covers an approximate area of 4.9 million square km, or a little over 3% of Mars' surface area. Most of the region called Acidalia Planitia is found in Acidalium quadrangle. Parts of Tempe Terra, Arabia Terra, and Chryse Planitia are also in this quadrangle.

This area contains many bright spots on a dark background that may be mud volcanoes. There are also some gullies that are believed to have formed by relatively recent flows of liquid water.

== Etymology ==
Mare Acidalium (Acidalian Sea) is the name of a telescopic albedo feature located at 45° N and 330° E on Mars. The feature was named for a well or fountain in Boeotia, Greece. According to classical tradition, it is a location where Venus and the Graces bathed. The name was approved by the International Astronomical Union (IAU) in 1958.

== Physiography and geology ==
The quadrangle contains many features, including gullies and possible shorelines of an ancient northern ocean. The boundary between the southern highlands and the northern lowlands lies in Mare Acidalium. The "Face on Mars", of great interest to the general public, is located near 40.8 degrees north and 9.6 degrees west, in an area called Cydonia. Mare Acidalium also contains the Kasei Valles system of canyons.

== See also ==
- Climate of Mars
- HiRISE
- HiWish
- List of quadrangles on Mars
- Martian Gullies
- Cydonia (Mars)

MC-01 Mare Boreum (features)
| MC-02 Diacria (features) | | MC-03 Arcadia (features) | MC-04 Acidalium (features) | MC-05 Ismenius Lacus (features) | | MC-06 Casius (features) | MC-07 Cebrenia (features) |
| MC-08 Amazonis (features) | MC-09 Tharsis (features) | MC-10 Lunae Palus (features) | MC-11 Oxia Palus (features) | MC-12 Arabia (features) | MC-13 Syrtis Major (features) | MC-14 Amenthes (features) | MC-15 Elysium (features) |
| MC-16 Memnonia (features) | MC-17 Phoenicis Lacus (features) | MC-18 Coprates (features) | MC-19 Margaritifer Sinus (features) | MC-20 Sinus Sabaeus (features) | MC-21 Iapygia (features) | MC-22 Mare Tyrrhenum (features) | MC-23 Aeolis (features) |
| MC-24 Phaethontis (features) | | MC-25 Thaumasia (features) | MC-26 Argyre (features) | MC-27 Noachis (features) | | MC-28 Hellas (features) | MC-29 Eridania (features) |
MC-30 Mare Australe (features)
