= List of valles on Mars =

Valley-like topographical features

Valles (singular vallis) on Mars are similar to valleys on Earth. Some features that take this title may be better described as canyons or chasmata; see List of Chasmata on Mars. Coordinates are given as planetocentric latitude with east longitude. Large valles are named for the words for "Mars" or "star" in various languages, while small ones are named for rivers.

Name	Coordinates	Length (km)	Namesake	Notes
Abus Vallis	5.54°S 212.7°E	58.0	Classical name for Humber River	
Al-Qahira Vallis	18.21°S 162.5°E	555.0	"The Conqueror" (how Mars is called) in Arabic	
Allegheny Vallis	9.1°S 306.0°E	200.0	Allegheny River	
Anio Valles	37.78°N 55.9°E	36.5	Classical name for Aniene River in Italy	
Apsus Vallis	34.79°N 135.0°E	120.0	Classical name for Seman River in Albania	
Arda Valles	20.59°S 327.7°E	186.0	Arda River	
Ares Vallis	10.29°N 334.2°E	1700.0	Word for "Mars" in Greek: Άρης	Landing site of the Mars Pathfinder
Arnus Vallis	13.95°N 72.5°E	280.0	Arno River	
Asopus Vallis	4.35°S 210.3°E	33.0	Classical name for Boeotian Asopus river in Greece	
Athabasca Valles	8.5°N 155.0°E	285.0	Athabasca River	Carved by water from Cerberus Fossae
Auqakuh Vallis	30.12°N 60.1°E	312.0	Word for "Mars" in Quechua	
Axius Valles	55.7°S 70.1°E	349.0	Classical name for Vardar River in Greece	
Bahram Vallis	20.49°N 302.5°E	246.9	Word for "Mars" in Persian	
Bashkaus Valles	25.7°S 356.7°E	302.0	Bashkaus River	
Brazos Valles	6.23°S 18.9°E	458.0	Brazos River	
Buvinda Vallis	33.1°N 151.9°E	119.6	Classical name for River Boyne in Ireland	
Chico Valles	66.77°S 206.5°E	450.0	River in Argentina.	
Clanis Valles	33.2°N 58.4°E	58.0	Classical name for the river Chiani in Italy	
Clasia Vallis	33.8°N 56.9°E	125.0	Classical river in Umbria, Italy	
Clota Vallis	25.55°S 339.4°E	112.0	Ancient name for River Clyde in Scotland	
Columbia Valles	9.42°S 317.08°E	94.0	Columbia River	
Coogoon Valles	17.12°S 338.1°E	300.0	River in Australia	
Cusus Valles	14.34°N 50.5°E	249.0	Classical name for Hron River in Slovakia	
Daga Vallis	11.99°S 317.62°E	70.0	Dagā River in Burma	
Dao Vallis	38.38°S 87.9°E	816.0	Word for "star" in Thai	
Deva Vallis	7.61°S 203.0°E	48.0	Classical name for River Dee in Scotland	
Dittaino Valles	1.48°S 293.0°E	138.0	Dittaino River	
Doanus Vallis	63.04°S 334.4°E	131.0	Classical river shown in Ptolemy's map; possibly Mekong River	
Drava Valles	48.68°S 166.3°E	150.0	Drava River	
Drilon Vallis	7.22°N 307.6°E	94.0	Classical name for Drin River in Albania	
Dubis Vallis	5.24°S 211.8°E	37.0	Classical name for Doubs River in France	
Dulce Vallis	4.8°S 136.5°E	32.5	Dulce River	
Durius Valles	17.41°S 172.1°E	223.0	Classical name for Douro River in Portugal	
Dzigai Vallis	58.51°S 323.4°E	326.0	Word for "valley" in Navajo	
Elaver Vallis	9.39°S 310.5°E	160.0	Classical name for Allier River in France	
Enipeus Vallis	36.69°N 266.9°E	357.0	Classical name for Enipeas River in Greece	
Evros Vallis	12.56°S 13.9°E	335.0	Evros River	
Frento Vallis	49.98°S 345.5°E	277.0	Classical name for Fortore River in Italy	
Gediz Vallis	4.85°S 137.44°E	8.3	Gediz River in Turkey	
Granicus Valles	30.58°N 129.97°E	777.8	Ancient name for the Biga Çayı, a river in Turkey	
Grjotá Valles	15.43°N 165.4°E	370.0	River in Iceland	
Harmakhis Vallis	40.48°S 90.4°E	475.0	Word for "Mars" in Ancient Egyptian	
Havel Vallis	0.8°N 302.5°E	240.2	Havel River	
Hebrus Valles	19.99°N 126.6°E	317.0	Ancient name for the Maritsa, a river in Greece	
Her Desher Vallis	25.15°S 312.0°E	107.0	Word for "Mars" in Egyptian Arabic	
Hermus Vallis	5.32°S 212.19°E	53.3	Classical name for Gediz River in Turkey	
Himera Valles	21.38°S 337.2°E	160.0	Classical name for Grande River in Italy	
Hrad Vallis	38.38°N 135.3°E	825.0	Word for "Mars" in Armenian	
Huallaga Vallis	26.7°S 79.1°E	92.5	Huallaga River	
Huo Hsing Vallis	30.22°N 66.6°E	318.0	Word for "Mars" in Chinese:火星/huǒxīng	
Hypanis Valles	9.49°N 313.3°E	231.0	Classical name for Kuban River in Russia	
Hypsas Vallis	33.7°N 57.9°E	32.8	Classical name for river in Sicily	
Iberus Vallis	21.28°N 152.0°E	80.2	Classical name for Ebro River in Spain	
Indus Vallis	19.1°N 38.7°E	307.0	Indus River	
Isara Valles	5.34°S 213.4°E	8.0	Classical name for Oise River in France	
Ituxi Vallis	25.15°N 153.0°E	62.0	Ituxi River in Brazil	
Kārūn Valles	35.9°S 174.1°E	64.0	Karun River	
Kasei Valles	24.36°N 295.0°E	1780.0	Word for "Mars" in Japanese: かせい	
Labou Vallis	8.6°S 205.5°E	222.0	Word for "Mars" in French	
Ladon Valles	22.37°S 331.3°E	278.0	Ladon River in Greece	
Lethe Vallis	3.96°N 153.5°E	225.0	River Lethe in Alaska	
Licus Vallis	2.87°S 126.1°E	219.1	Ancient name for Lech River in Germany and Austria	
Liris Valles	10.58°S 57.9°E	613.0	Ancient name for Liri River in Italy	
Lobo Vallis	26.94°N 298.8°E	102.0	River in Ivory Coast	
Locras Valles	8.6°N 47.7°E	314.0	Ancient name for river in Corsica mentioned by Ptolemy	
Loire Valles	18.11°S 343.3°E	720.0	Loire River	
Louros Valles	8.41°S 278.0°E	517.0	Louros River	
Ma'adim Vallis	21.58°S 177.3°E	825.0	Word for "Mars" in Hebrew: מַאַדִים	
Mad Vallis	56.2°S 76.1°E	524.0	Mad River	
Maja Valles	12.46°N 301.7°E	1516.0	Word for "Mars" in Nepali	
Mamers Valles	39.98°N 17.8°E	1020.0	Word for "Mars" in Oscan	
Mangala Valles	11.47°S 209.0°E	828.0	Word for "Mars" in Sanskrit	
Marikh Vallis	19.25°S 3.9°E	1280.0	Word for "Mars" in Malaysian	
Valles Marineris	13.75°S 300.8°E	3769.0	Mariner 9 Space program	Largest known crevice in the Solar System
Marte Vallis	14.84°N 183.5°E	1185.0	Word for "Mars" in Spanish: marte	
Matrona Vallis	7.61°S 176.1°E	51.0	Classical name for Marne River in France	
Maumee Valles	19.49°N 306.8°E	350.0	Maumee River	
Mawrth Vallis	22.37°N 343.5°E	636.0	Word for "Mars" in Welsh: Mawrth	
Minio Vallis	4.25°S 208.2°E	88.0	Classical name for river in Italy	
Moa Valles	35.6°N 305.3°E	265.0	Moa River	
Morava Valles	13.29°S 335.55°E	325.0	Morava River	
Mosa Vallis	14.74°S 22.2°E	171.0	Meuse River	
Munda Vallis	5.44°S 213.7°E	10.0	Classical name for Mondego River in Portugal	
Naktong Vallis	5.24°N 32.9°E	494.0	Nakdong River	
Nanedi Valles	4.85°N 311.0°E	508.0	Word for "planet" in Sesotho	
Napo Vallis	26.0°S 78.0°E	87.5	Napo River	
Neretva Vallis	18.55°S 77.2°E	17	Named after the Neretva River in Bosnia and Herzegovina	
Nestus Valles	7.12°S 201.4°E	33.0	Classical name for Nestos River in Macedonia (Greece)	
Nia Vallis	53.79°S 325.3°E	133.0	Classical river name	Named used by Lowell for canal
Nicer Vallis	7.22°S 201.8°E	54.0	Classical name for Neckar River in Germany	
Niger Vallis	35.09°S 92.2°E	333.0	Niger River	
Nirgal Vallis	28.13°S 318.0°E	496.0	Word for "Mars" in Babylonian	
Ochus Valles	7.12°N 314.9°E	104.0	Classical name for Hari River in Turkmenistan	
Okavango Valles	38.1°N 9.0°E	285.1	Okavango River	
Oltis Valles	23.66°S 338.3°E	173.0	Ancient name for Lot River in France	
Osuga Valles	15.14°S 321.4°E	185.0	Osuga River	
Padus Vallis	4.55°S 209.9°E	46.0	Classical name for Po River in Italy	
Pallacopas Vallis	55.0°S 339.0°E	660.0	Classical canal in Babylonia	Name used by Lowell for a canal
Paraná Valles	22.87°S 349.8°E	350.0	Paraná River	
Patapsco Vallis	23.76°N 152.5°E	153.0	Patapsco River	
Peace Vallis	4.21°S 137.23°E	35.24	"River in British Columbia and Alberta, Canada"	
Pliva Vallis	18.67°S 78.35°E	30	Named after the Pliva River in Bosnia and Herzegovina	
Protva Valles	28.92°S 299.4°E	260.0	Protva River	
Rahway Valles	9.3°N 173.8°E	500.0	Rahway River	
Ravi Vallis	0.2°S 319.3°E	205.5	Ravi River	
Ravius Valles	46.18°N 248.7°E	233.0	Classical name for river in Ireland	
Reull Vallis	42.28°S 104.1°E	945.0	Word for "planet" in Gaelic	
Rhabon Valles	21.18°N 268.5°E	247.0	Classical name for Jiu River in Romania	
Rubicon Valles	44.68°N 243.0°E	240.0	Ancient name for Rubicon River in Italy	
Runa Vallis	28.43°S 323.2°E	39.2	Name proposed by Soviets	
Sabis Vallis	5.24°S 207.5°E	206.0	Classical name for Sambre River in France and Belgium	
Sabrina Vallis	11.08°N 311.0°E	237.0	Classical name for River Severn in Wales and England	
Sakarya Vallis	5.10°S 137.33°E	26.0	Classical name for Sakarya River in Turkey	
Samara Valles	24.85°S 340.9°E	615.0	Ancient name for Somme River in France	
Scamander Vallis	15.89°N 28.53°E	269.0	Ancient name for Karamenderes River in Turkey	
Senus Vallis	5.24°S 213.0°E	20.0	Classical name for river in Ireland	
Sepik Vallis	0.89°S 294.2°E	56.0	Sepik River	
Shalbatana Vallis	7.71°N 317.9°E	963.0	Word for "Mars" in Akkadian	
Silinka Vallis	8.9°N 331.8°E	140.0	River in Russia	
Simud Valles	19.59°N 322.2°E	945.0	Word for "Mars" in Sumerian	
Stura Vallis	22.67°N 142.4°E	75.0	Classical name for Stura di Demonte river in Italy	
Subur Vallis	11.67°N 306.8°E	26.0	Classical name for river in Mauritania	
Sungari Vallis	40.03°S 88.84°E	430.0	Songhua River	
Surinda Valles	28.92°S 324.9°E	95.0	Name proposed by Soviets; found on Mars 5 map	
Surius Vallis	61.53°S 311.6°E	570.0	From a river of Colchis	Name used by Lowell for canal
Tader Valles	48.78°S 207.5°E	200.0	Ancient name for Segura River in Spain	
Tagus Valles	6.72°S 114.4°E	155.4	Tagus River	
Tana Vallis	4.8°S 332.1°E	56.5	Tana River	
Taus Vallis	4.85°S 211.5°E	12.6	Classical name for river in Scotland	
Termes Vallis	11.08°S 202.9°E	48.0	Classical name for Tormes River in Spain	
Teviot Vallis	43.38°S 102.1°E	140.0	River Teviot	
Tigre Valles	11.88°S 322.88°E	118	Tigre River	
Tinia Valles	4.65°S 211.0°E	18.7	Classical name for river in Italy	
Tinjar Valles	37.69°N 124.2°E	425.0	Tinjar River in Malaysia	
Tinto Vallis	3.96°S 111.4°E	146.5	Rio Tinto	
Tisia Valles	11.77°S 45.7°E	399.0	Ancient name for Tisza River in Hungary	
Tiu Valles	15.73°N 324.3°E	1720.0	Word for "Mars" in Old English: Tiu	
Trebia Valles	32.11°N 150.0°E	183.0	Classical name for Trebbia River in Italy	
Tyras Vallis	8.31°N 309.8°E	68.0	Classical name for Dniester River in Ukraine	
Una Vallis	18.29°S 77.07°E	5	Named after the Una River in Bosnia and Herzegovina	
Uzboi Vallis	29.52°S 322.9°E	366.0	Dry riverbed of the Uzboy River in Turkmenistan	
Varus Valles	8.6°S 203.8°E	92.0	Classical name for Var River in France	
Vedra Valles	19.2°N 304.4°E	115.0	Ancient name for river in Great Britain	
Verde Vallis	0.49°S 29.8°E	95.0	Verde River	
Vichada Valles	19.4°S 88.1°E	430.0	Vichada River	
Vistula Valles	13.55°N 308.1°E	190.0	Vistula River in Poland	
Waikato Vallis	33.2°S 113.81°E	230.0	Waikato River	
Walla Walla Vallis	9.79°S 305.5°E	24.0	Walla Walla River	
Warrego Valles	41.88°S 267.0°E	188.0	Warrego River	
Zarqa Valles	0.16°N 80.82°E	490	Zarqa River	
