= Padus =

Padus can refer to:

- Po (river) ("Padus" in ancient Latin)
- Prunus subg. Padus, a subgenus of the plant genus Prunus
- Padus, Wisconsin
- Padus Vallis, a geographical feature (valley) on the planet Mars
- Padus, Inc., developer of DiscJuggler

== See also ==
- Padania, alternative name for Po Valley, Italy
