= Stura (disambiguation) =

Stura was a département of the French Consulate and of the First French Empire in present-day Italy.

Stura may also refer to:

== Rivers ==
- Stura di Ovada, a river of Liguria and Piedmont, in Italy
- Stura del Monferrato, a river of Piedmont, in Italy
- Stura di Lanzo, a river of Piedmont, in Italy
- Stura di Demonte, a river of Piedmont, in Italy

== Valleys ==
- Stura Vallis, an ancient river valley of Mars
- Stura di Demonte Valley, a valley of Piedmont, in Italy
