= Sabis =

Sabis may refer to:

- SABIS, global school network
- Battle of the Sabis
- The river Sambre (Sabis in Latin)
- Sabis Vallis, valley on Mars named after the river Sabis

== See also ==
- The Sword of Knowledge, a trilogy of fantasy novels the first of which is called A Dirge for Sabis
