= Aromatum Chaos =

Geomorphological feature of the planet Mars

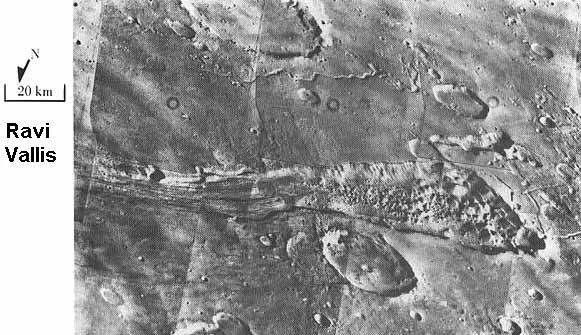
- Aromatum Chaos and Ravi Vallis, as seen by Viking Orbiter
- Feature type: Chaotic terrain
- Location: Mars
- Coordinates: 1.09°S 317.0°E
- Dimensions: 91.5 km (56.9 mi) by 30 km (19 mi)

Aromatum Chaos is a deep depression, in what is considered chaotic terrain. It is the source of the outflow channel Ravi Vallis, and is situated at the eastern end of Xanthe Terra, in the Margaritifer Sinus quadrangle (MC-19) region of Mars, located at 1.09°S 317.0°E. Aromatum Chaos is 91.5 km (56.9 mi) in length, and has an average width of about 30 km (19 mi).

The maximum depth of the floor of Aromatum Chaos has been calculated to be about 3.45 km (2.14 mi) below the rim level. The mean depth of the western two-thirds of the Aromatum Chaos depression is about 1.64 km, and the remaining eastern one third of the area, is estimated to be about 1.2±0.05 km in depth below the rim (using MOLA topography data). Thus, the average depth is 1.49 km (0.93 mi).

The Aromatum Chaos depression and the neighboring Ravi Vallis outflow channel are thought to have been caused by volcano-ice interactions, involving a combination of dikes and sills, which disrupted the cryosphere underneath the surface. This is thought to have pierced an underground aquifer, resulting in the release of large amounts of water. This in turn caused crustal collapse, which created the Aromatum Chaos depression, and a catastrophic flood event, which formed the Ravi Vallis outflow channel. The flood has been estimated to have lasted between 2 and 10 weeks. For estimates of water flow, such as the water speed, the volume discharge rate, and the minimum total water volume discharged, see the Ravi Vallis page.

Volcano-Ice interactions which took place at Aromatum Chaos, and the resulting catastrophic flood events which formed the neighboring Ravi Vallis outflow channel, are also known to have taken place in other parts of Mars, e.g.; Kasei Valles, and Mangala Valles.

== See also ==
- Chaos terrain
- List of areas of chaos terrain on Mars
- Martian chaos terrain
- Outburst flood
- Outflow channels
