= Labou Vallis =

Martian geographical feature

- Labou Vallis based on day-time THEMIS image
- Coordinates: 8.7°S 154.5°W

Labou Vallis is a valley in the Memnonia quadrangle of Mars, located at 8.7° south latitude and 154.5° west longitude. It is 222 km long and has dark slope streaks on its walls. The streaks are generally thought to be the dark material that has been exposed by bright dust moving down a steep slope in an avalanche. Labou is a distributary of the Mangala Vallis, emerging from an opening in a crater wall along the floor of the latter.

Labou Vallis, as seen by HiRISE. The full size image shows old and new (darker) dark slope streaks.

== Naming ==
The origin of the word "Labou" was previously stated to be the "French word for Mars," but this was found to be incorrect.
