= Minio Vallis =

Valley on Mars

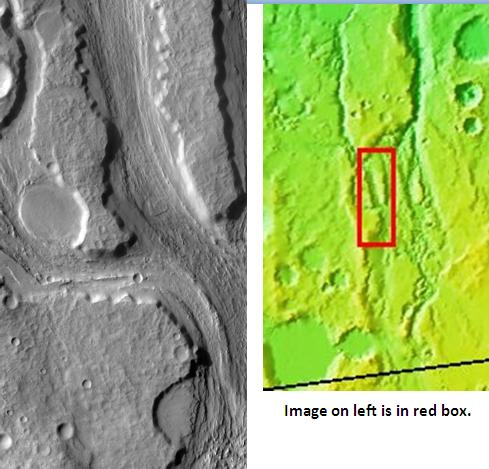
- Minio Vallis, as seen by THEMIS. Minio Vallis is a small river channel near the much larger Mangala Vallis.
- Coordinates: 4.3°S 151.8°W

Minio Vallis is an old river valley in the Memnonia quadrangle of Mars, located at 4.3° south latitude and 151.8° west longitude. It is 88 km long and was named after a classical name for river in Italy.

Minio Vallis Hanging Valleys, as seen by HiRISE. Two hanging valleys are visible, as well as many dark slope streaks.

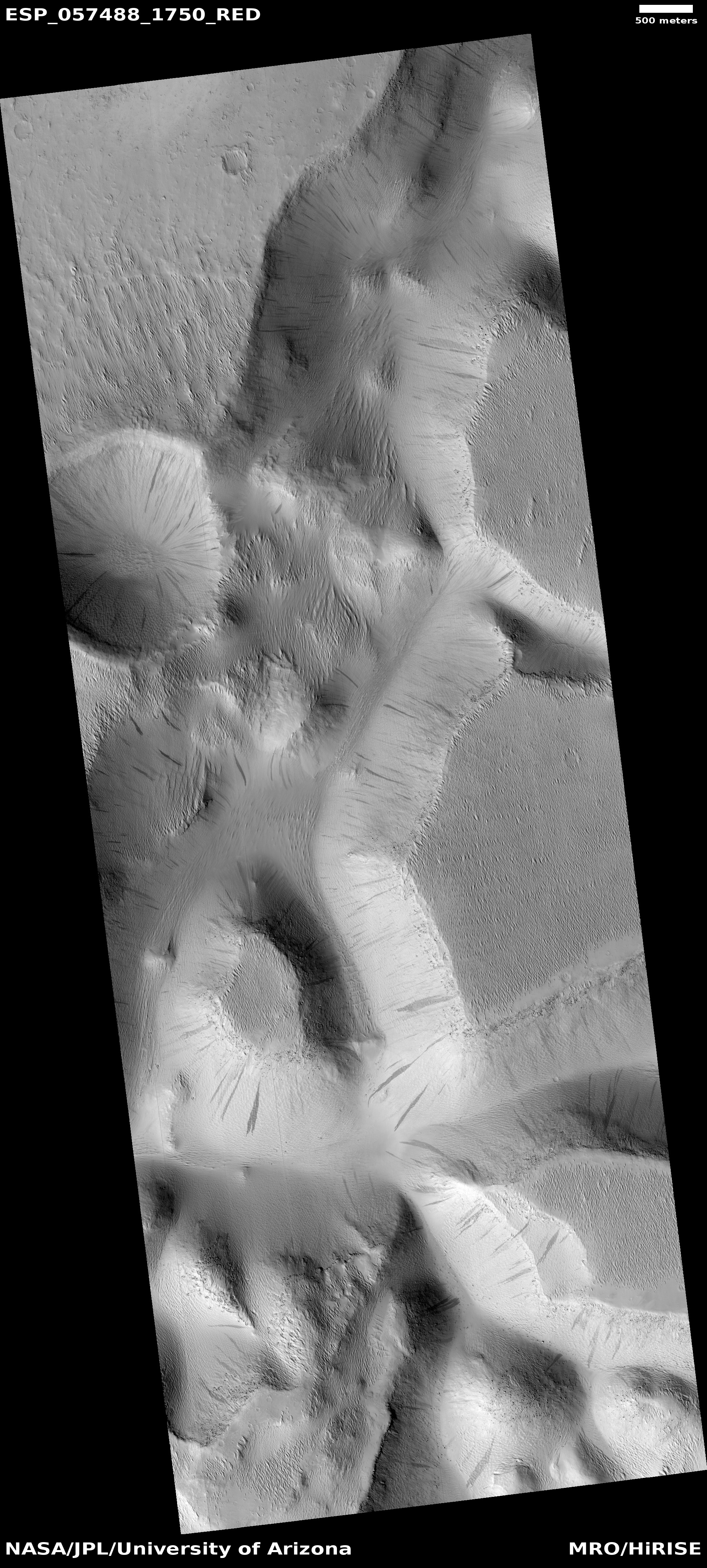
Minio Vallis, as seen by HiRISE under HiWish program Many dark slope streaks are present.
