= Mangala Fossa =

Geological depression on Mars

- Mangala Fossa and Mangala Valles (THEMIS image)
- Coordinates: 11.6°S 151.0°W
- Length: 828.0 km

Mangala Fossa is a graben in the Memnonia quadrangle of Mars, located near 11.6°S 151.0°W, which originated in the Hesperian and Amazonian epochs. The graben is located at the head of the outflow channel Mangala Valles, which is thought to have been formed by at least two catastrophic flood events during the same geological period, leading to the release of vast quantities of water from Mangala Fossa onto the Martian surface. The flooding was probably initiated by the emplacement of a dike radiating from the volcano Arsia Mons, resulting in the formation of the graben, Mangala Fossa, at the channels' head. This dike breached a pressurized aquifer trapped beneath a thick "cryosphere" (layer of frozen ground) beneath the surface. As the floor of the graben subsided, water found its way up one or both of the faults in the crust that defined the edges of the graben and spilled into the depression, eventually filling it and overflowing at the lowest point on the rim to erode the Mangala Valles channels.

"Mangala" is the name for Mars in Jyotish (or Hindu) astrology.

== Gallery ==
Mangala Fossa and Mangala Valles (USGS maps)

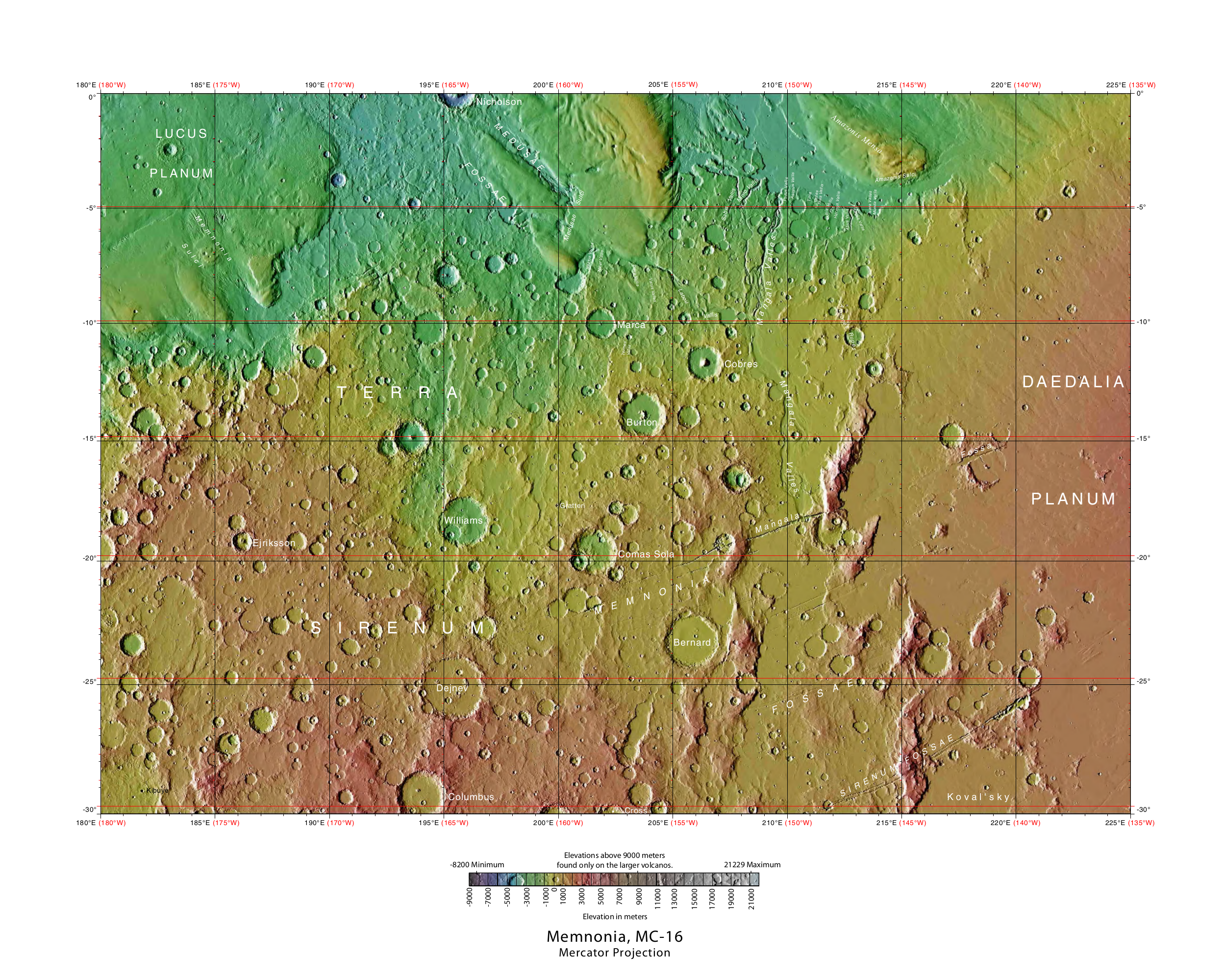
Context

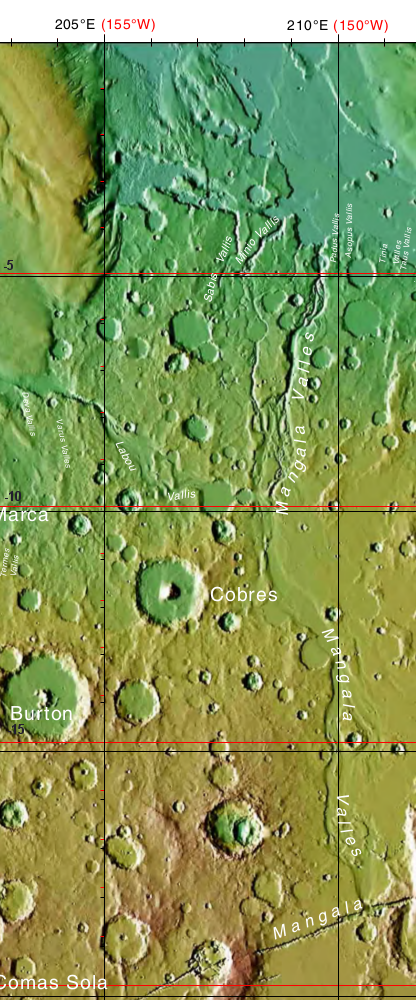
Close-up

Topographic maps (MOLA) – Memnonia region of Mars (left), and a close-up (right) of the location of Mangala Fossa and the source of the Mangala Valles outflow channel
Mangala Fossa and Mangala Valles
(THEMIS)

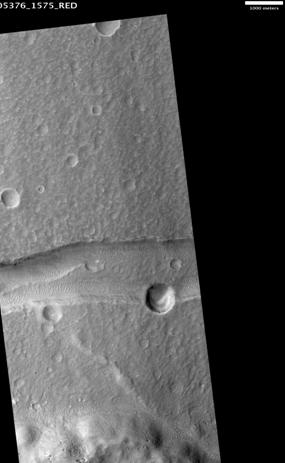
Graben in Memnonia Fossae – possible result of magmatic dikes, rather than regional tectonic stretching as seen by HiRISE

Mangala Valles - head region
(THEMIS)

== See also ==
- Outburst flood
- Outflow channels
