= Buvinda Vallis =

Valley on Mars

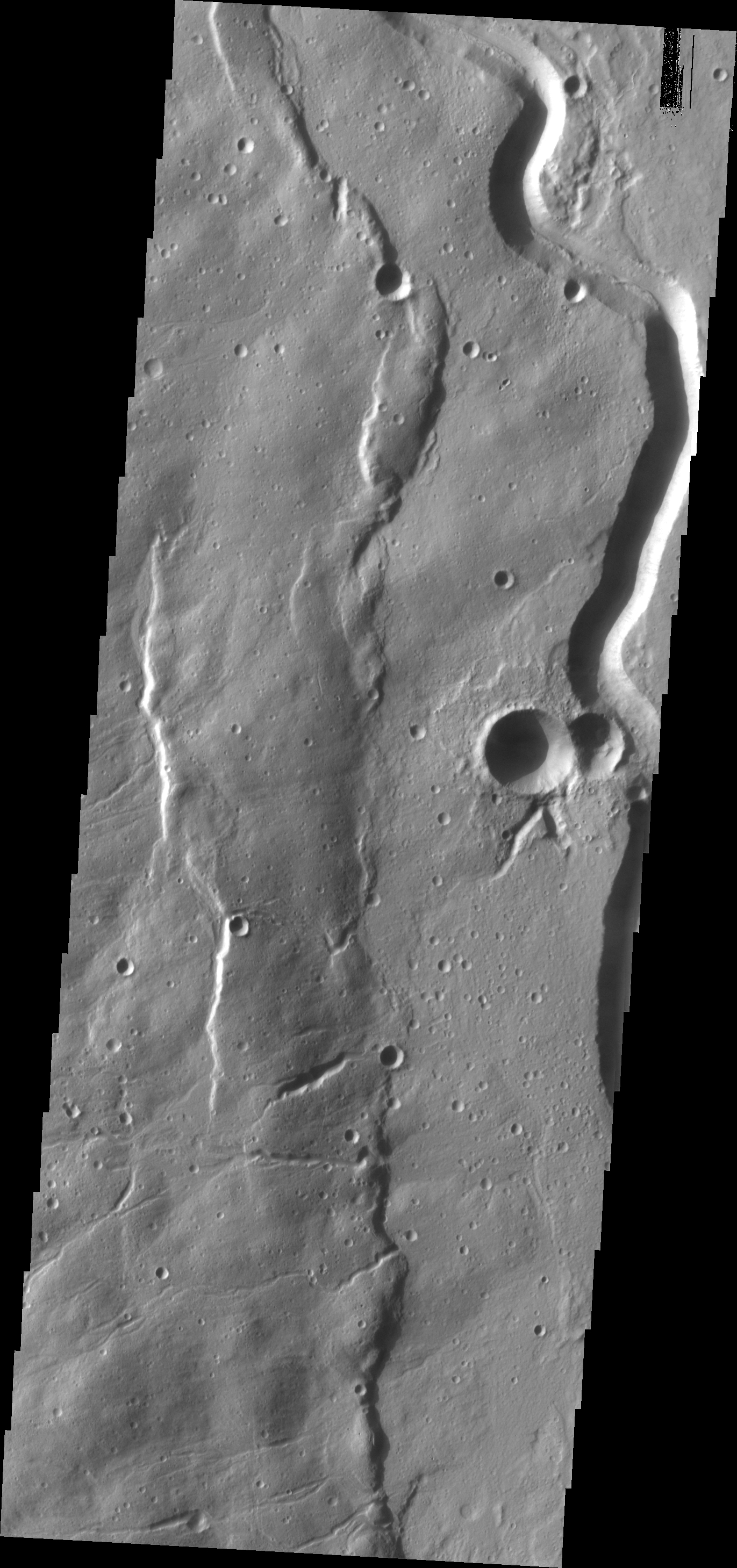
- Buvinda Vallis, as seen by THEMIS. Buvinda Vallis is associated with Hecates Tholus; it lies just east of Hecates Tholus.
- Coordinates: 33.4°N 208.1°W

Buvinda Vallis is a valley in the Cebrenia quadrangle of Mars, located at 33.4 N and 208.1 W. It is 119.6 km long. It was named after a classical river in Hibernia and the present River Boyne, Ireland.
