= Tyras Vallis =

Martian valley

Tyras Vallis is an ancient river valley in the Lunae Palus quadrangle of Mars. It is located at 8.4 N° and 50.2° W. It was named after a classical name for the present Dniester River (in Ukraine).

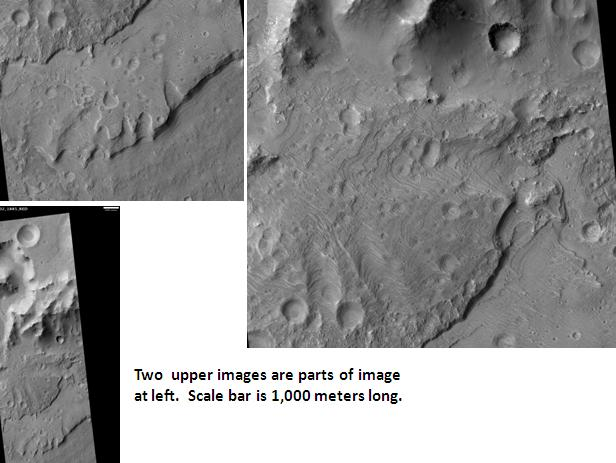
Tyras Vallis Fan Deposit, as seen by HiRISE. Click on image to see layers.

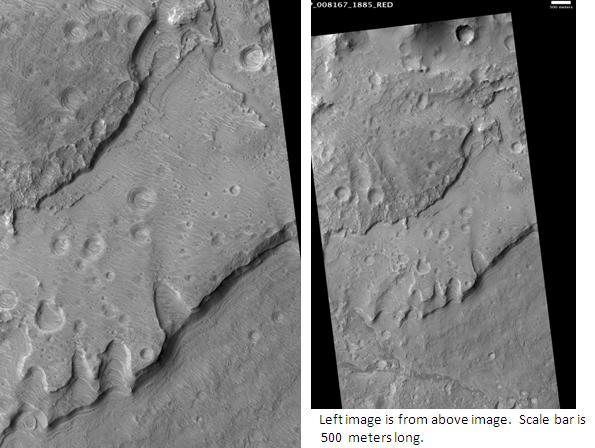
Tyras Vallis Fan Deposit at a different sun angle. The scale bar is 500 meters long. This image is just to the right of the previous image.

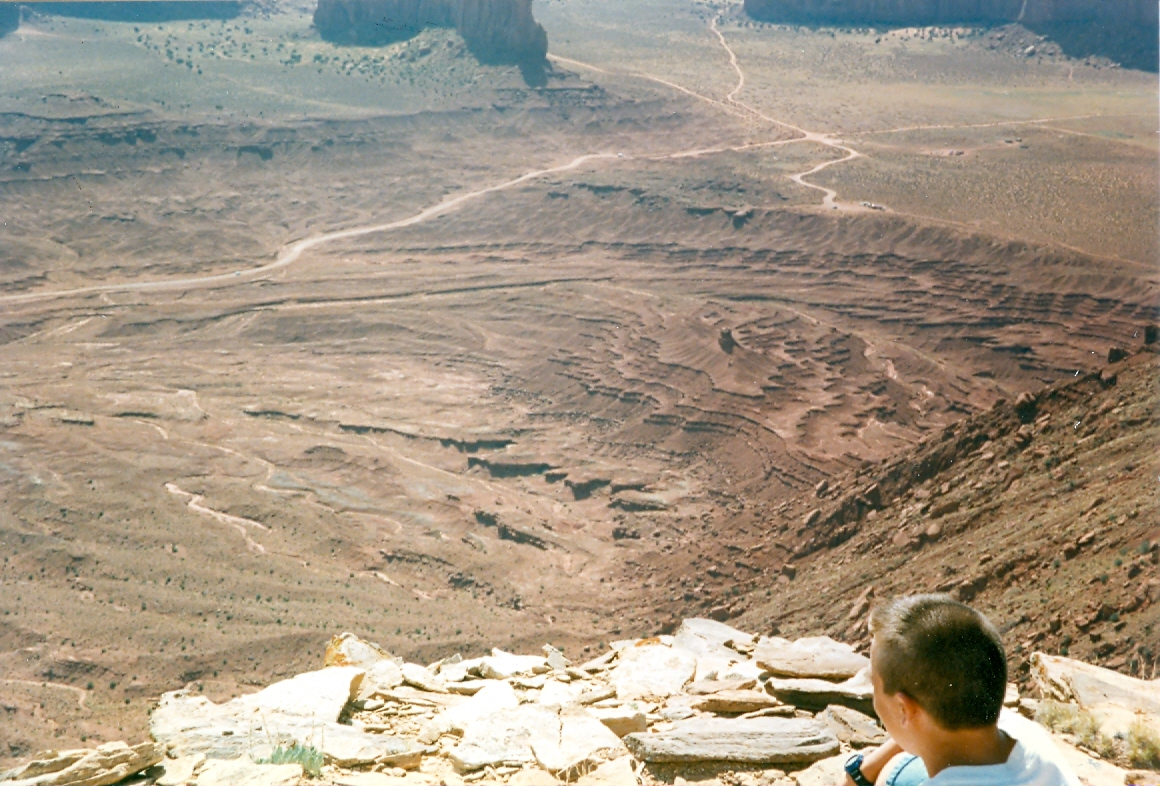
Layers in Monument Valley. These are accepted as being formed, at least in part, by water deposition. Since Mars contains similar layers, water remains as a major cause of layering on Mars.
