= Tinia Valles =

Valles on Mars

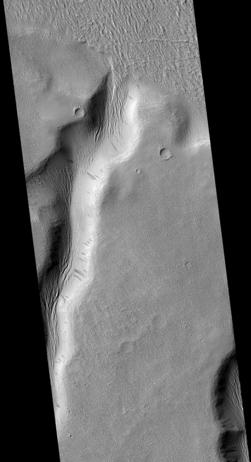
- The Tinia Valles, as seen by HiRISE (click for full size image to view the dark slope streaks)
- Coordinates: 4.7°S 149°W

The Tinia Valles are a set of channels in an ancient valley in the Memnonia quadrangle of Mars, located at 4.7° south latitude and 149° west longitude. They are 18.7 km long and were named after a classical river in Italy. The associated valley has many dark slope streaks on its walls. These features are widely believed to be avalanches of a thin layer of bright dust that usually covers the dark surface beneath.
