= Louros Valles =

Martian valleys

The Louros Valles are a system of valleys on the planet Mars in the Coprates quadrangle. They sit on the southern edge of Ius Chasma. They are east of Noctis Labyrinthus. They display many layers in their sidewalls. Many other places on Mars also show rocks arranged in layers. Rock layers can be formed by volcanoes, wind, or water. A detailed discussion of layering with many Martian examples can be found in Sedimentary Geology of Mars.

The Louros Valles are centered at 8.41 S and 278.23 E, and were named after a modern river in Greece. The name was approved in 1982.

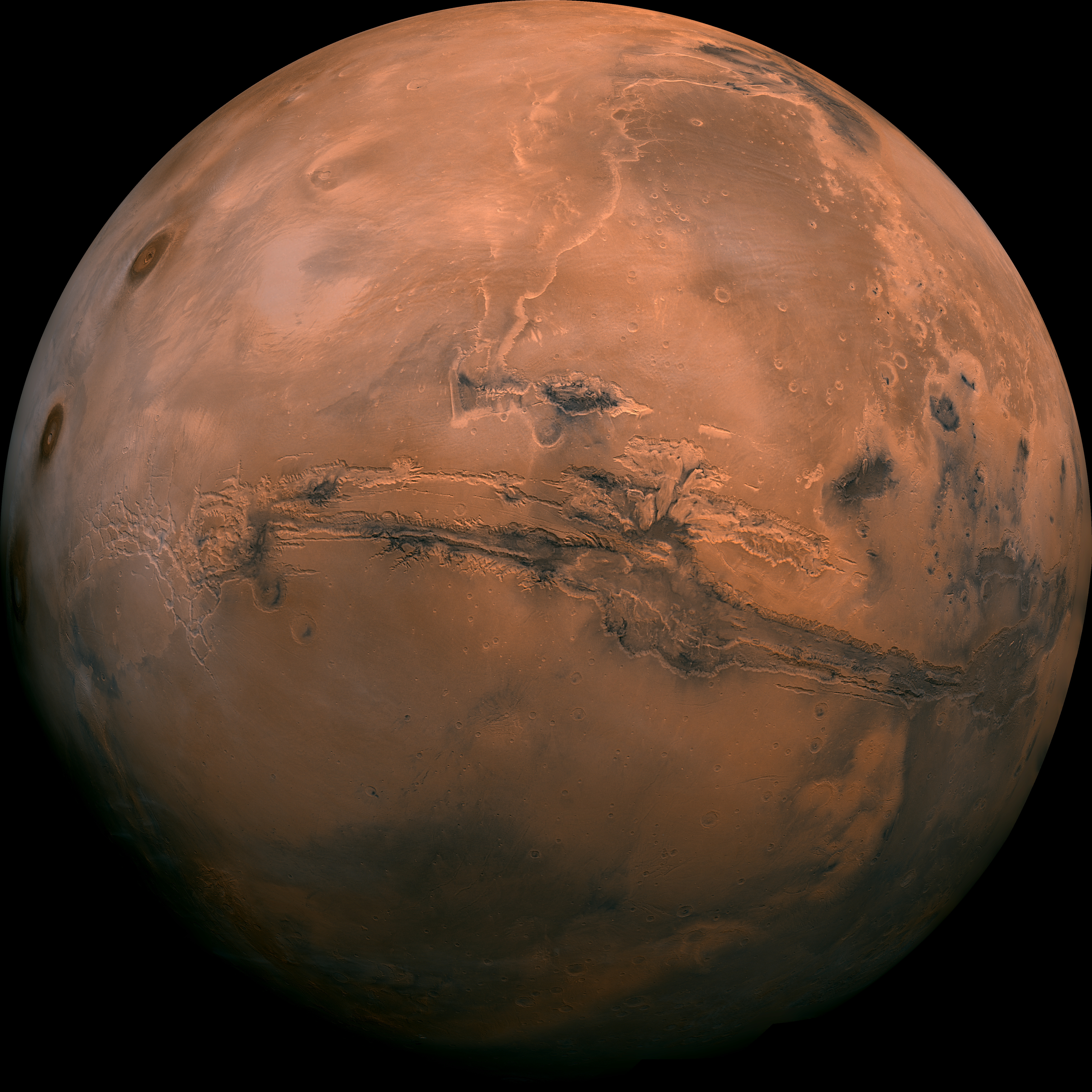
Wide view of Mars centered on Valles Marineris, taken with Viking images Note, this picture can be greatly enlarged by clicking on it several times.

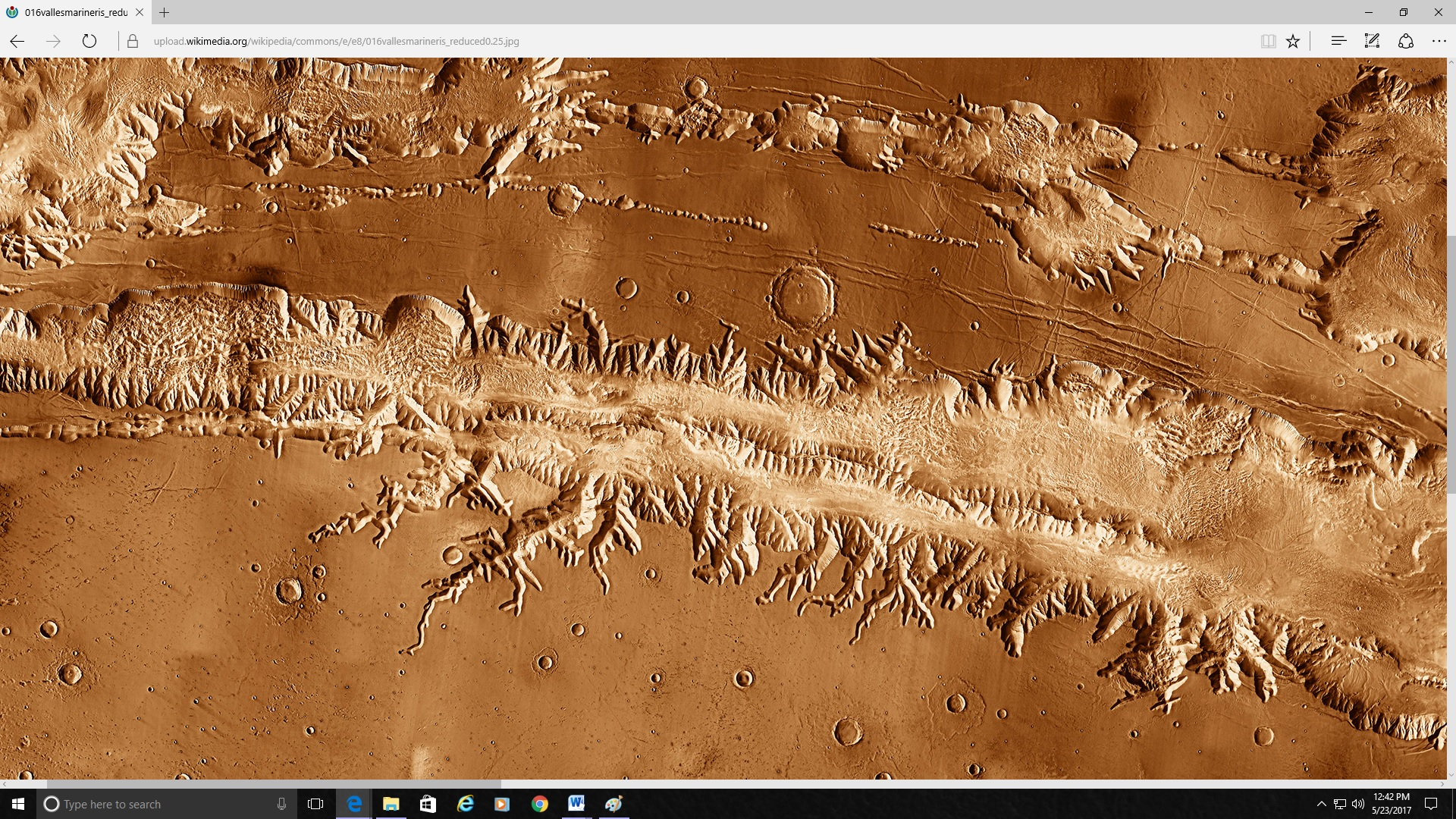
Wide view of part of Ius Chasma with the Louros Valles along its southern margin.

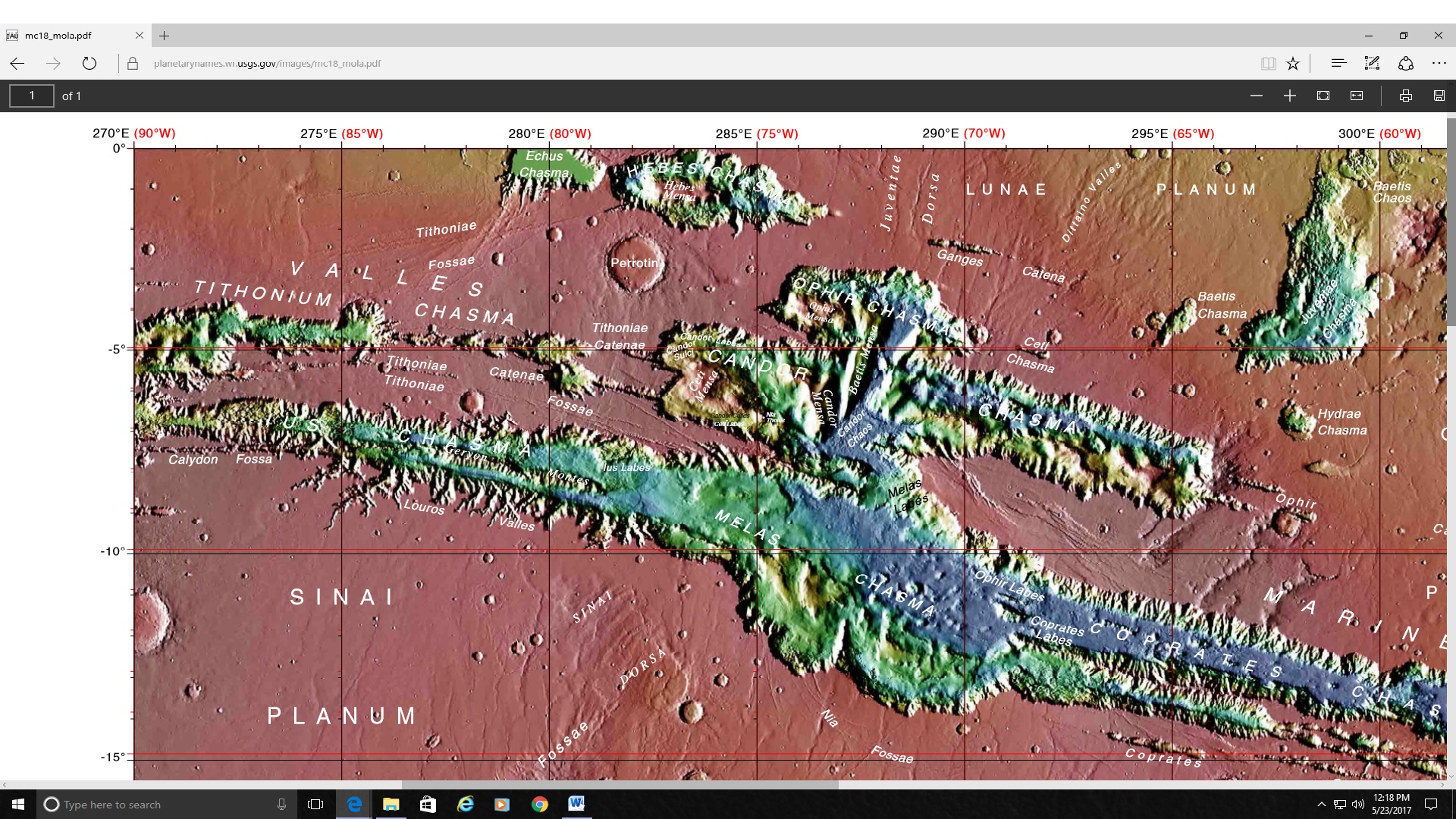
Labeled view of part of Valles Marineris. Colors indicate elevation. The Louros Valles are in the middle left of the image.

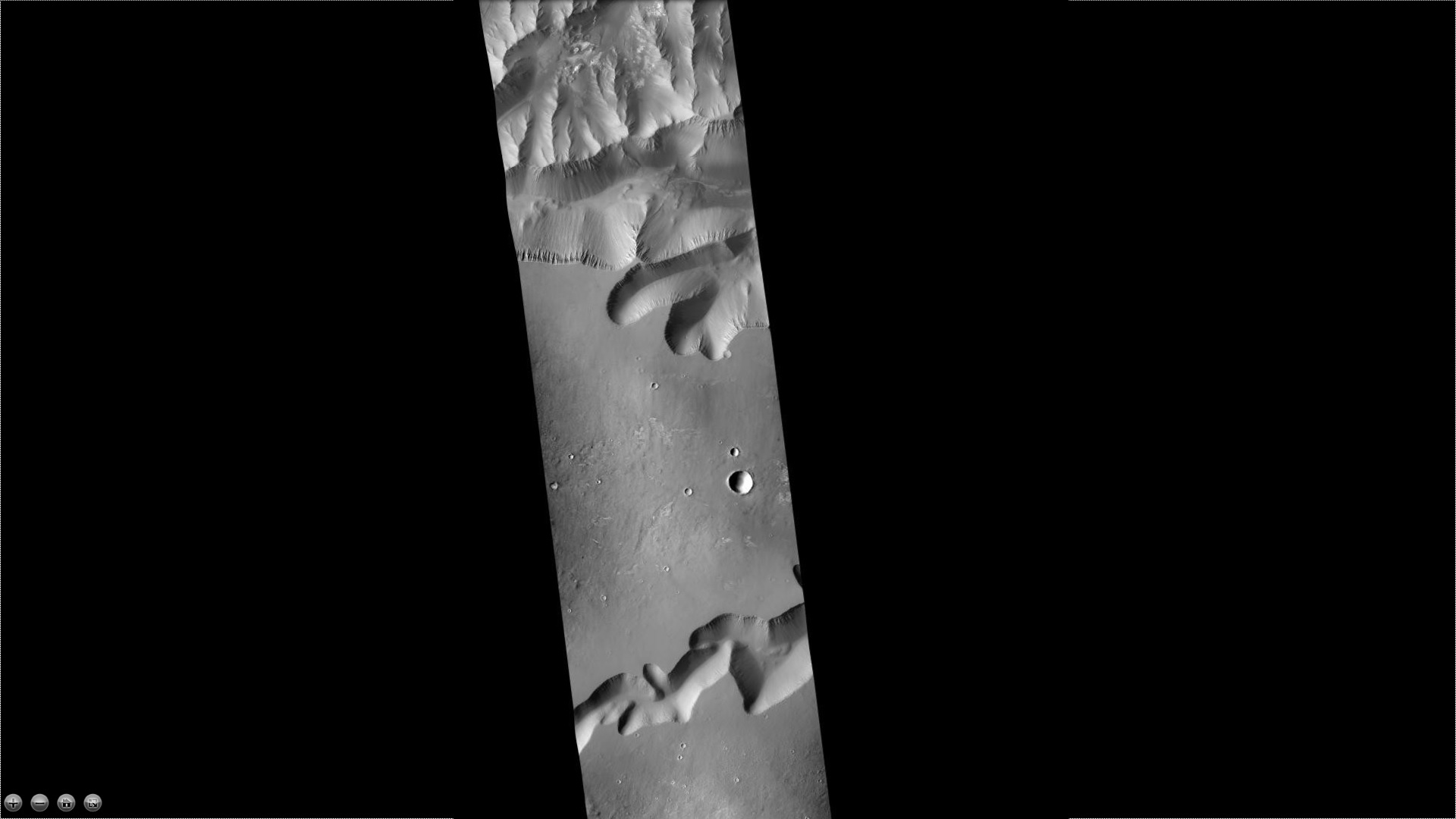
Wide view with CTX image of part of the Louros Valles

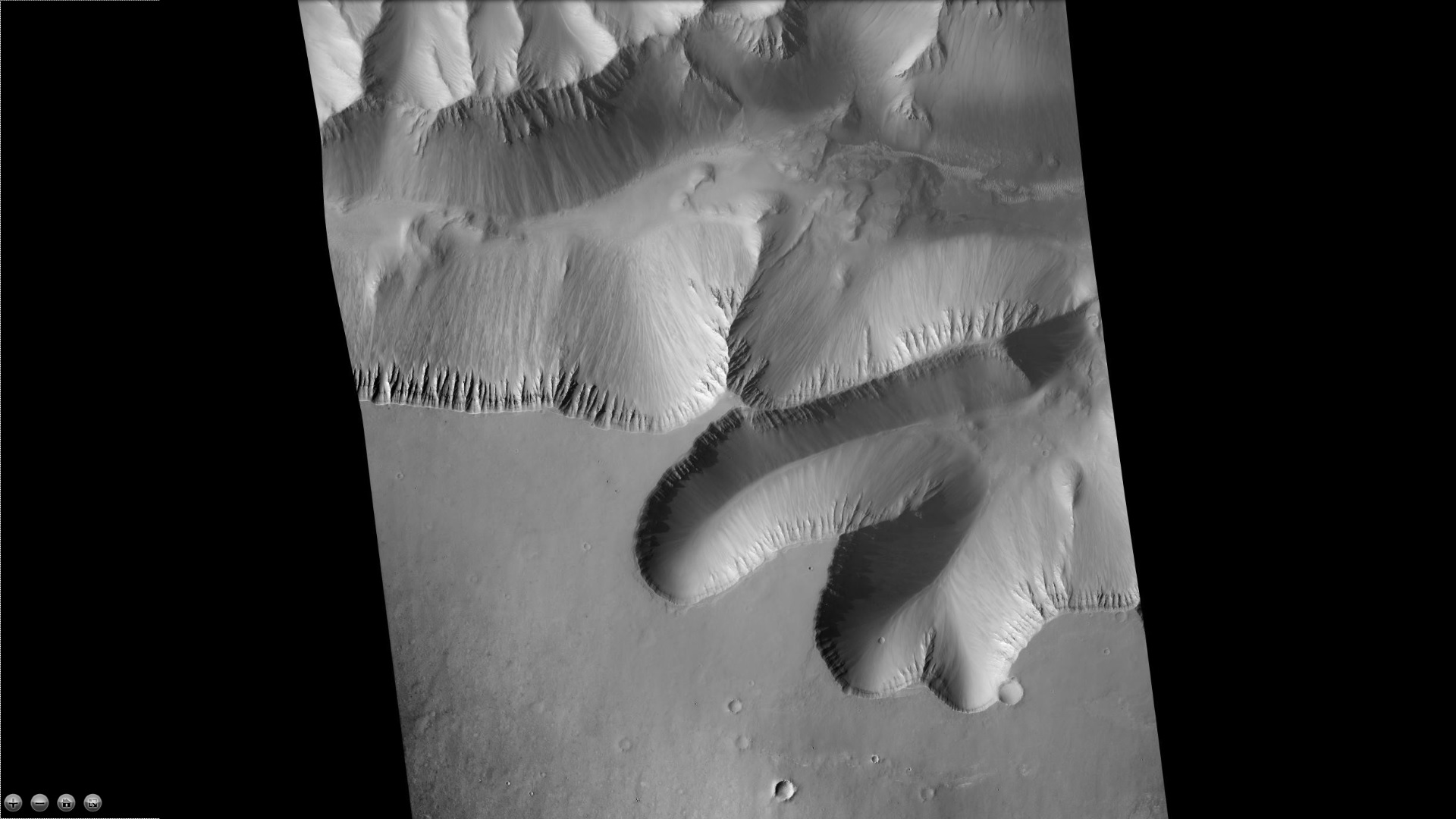
Closer view with CTX image of part of the Louros Valles

The following set of images start with wide views of the whole planet that are centered near the Louros Valles. They transition to close views with enlarged HiRISE images.

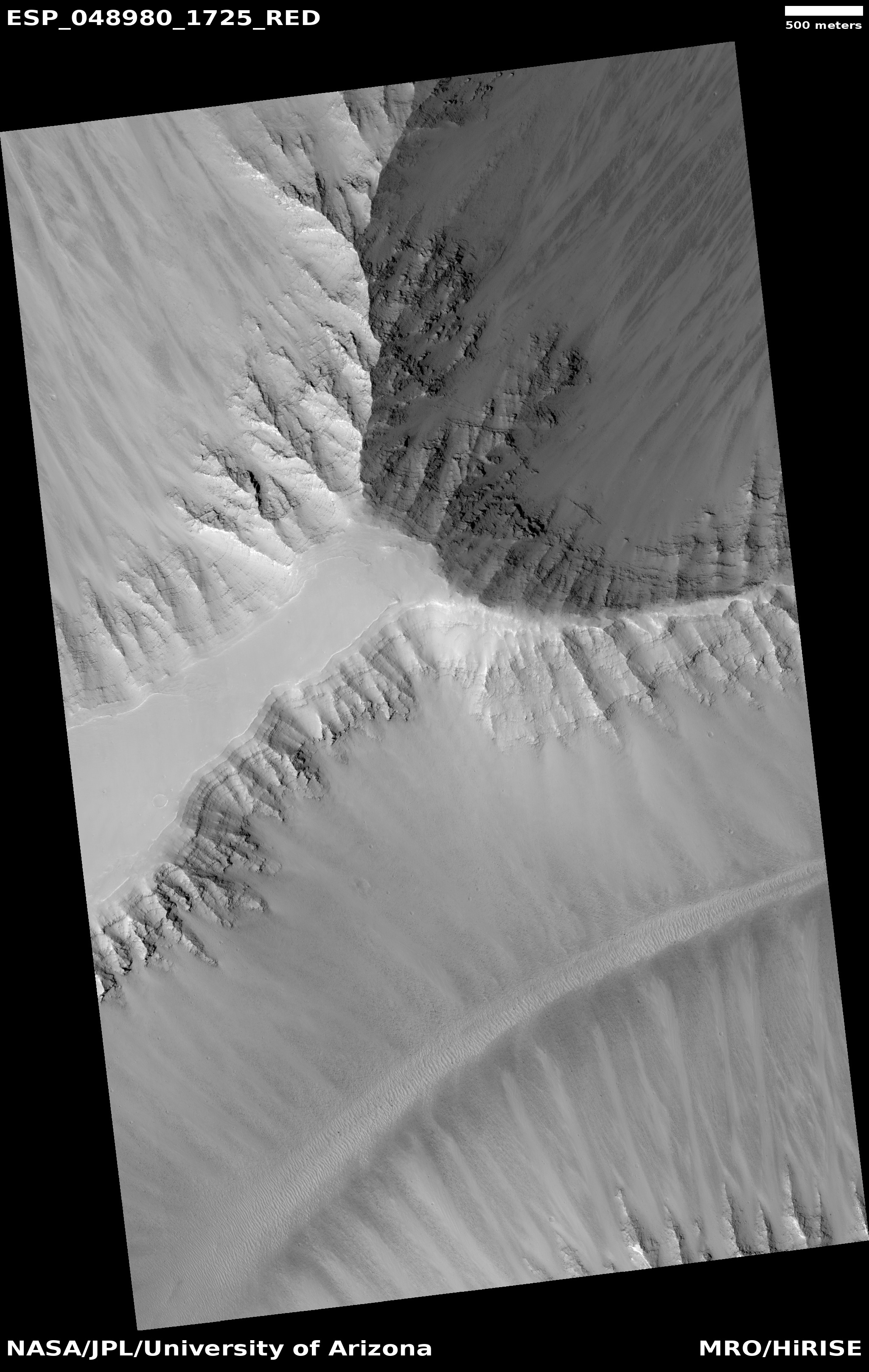
Wide view of layers in the Louros Valles, as seen by HiRISE under HiWish program. The Louros Valles are part of Ius Chasma.

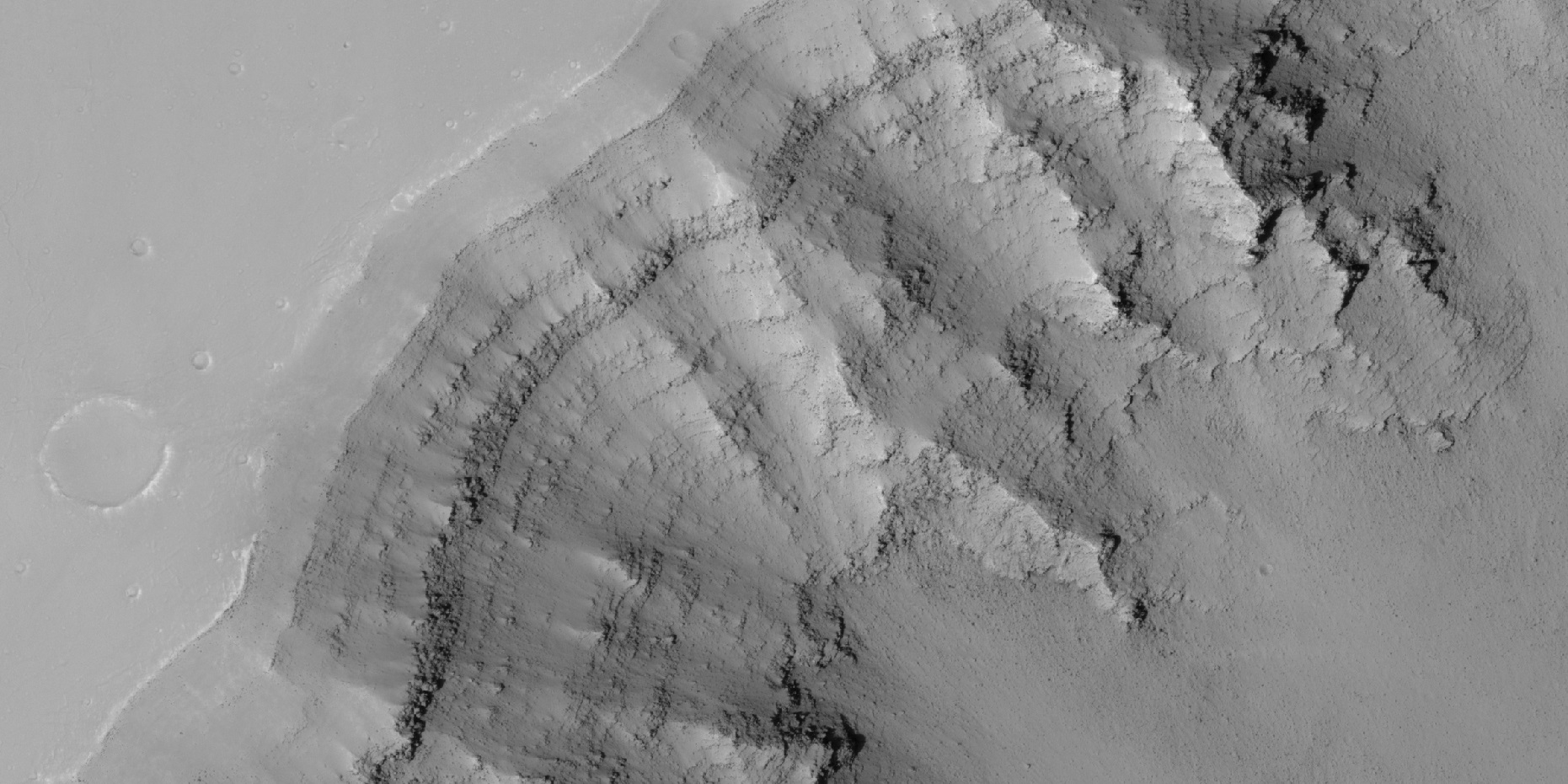
Close view of layers in the Louros Valles, as seen by HiRISE under HiWish program; this is an enlargement of a previous image.

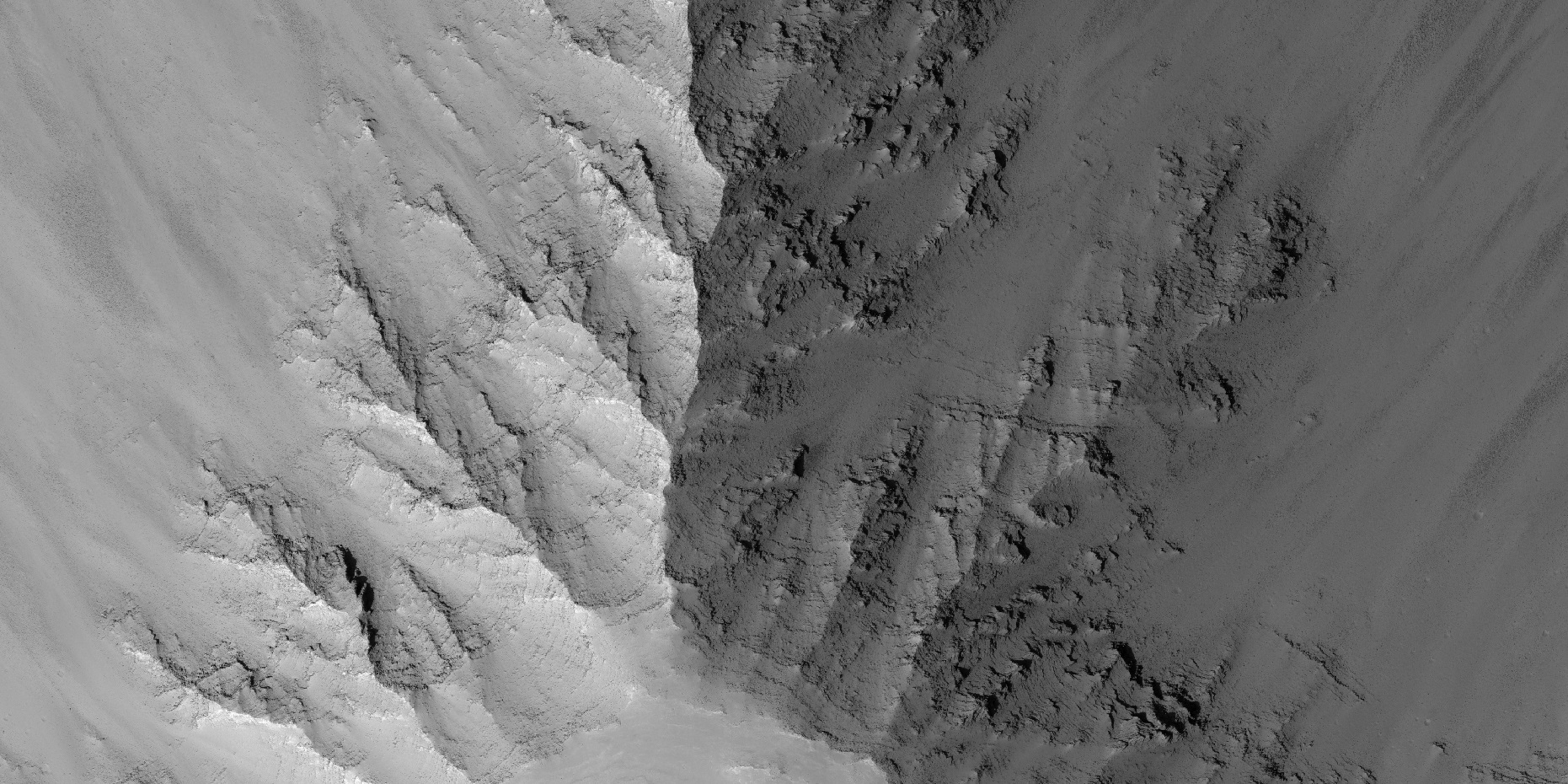
Close view of layers in the Louros Valles, as seen by HiRISE under HiWish program; this is an enlargement of a previous image.

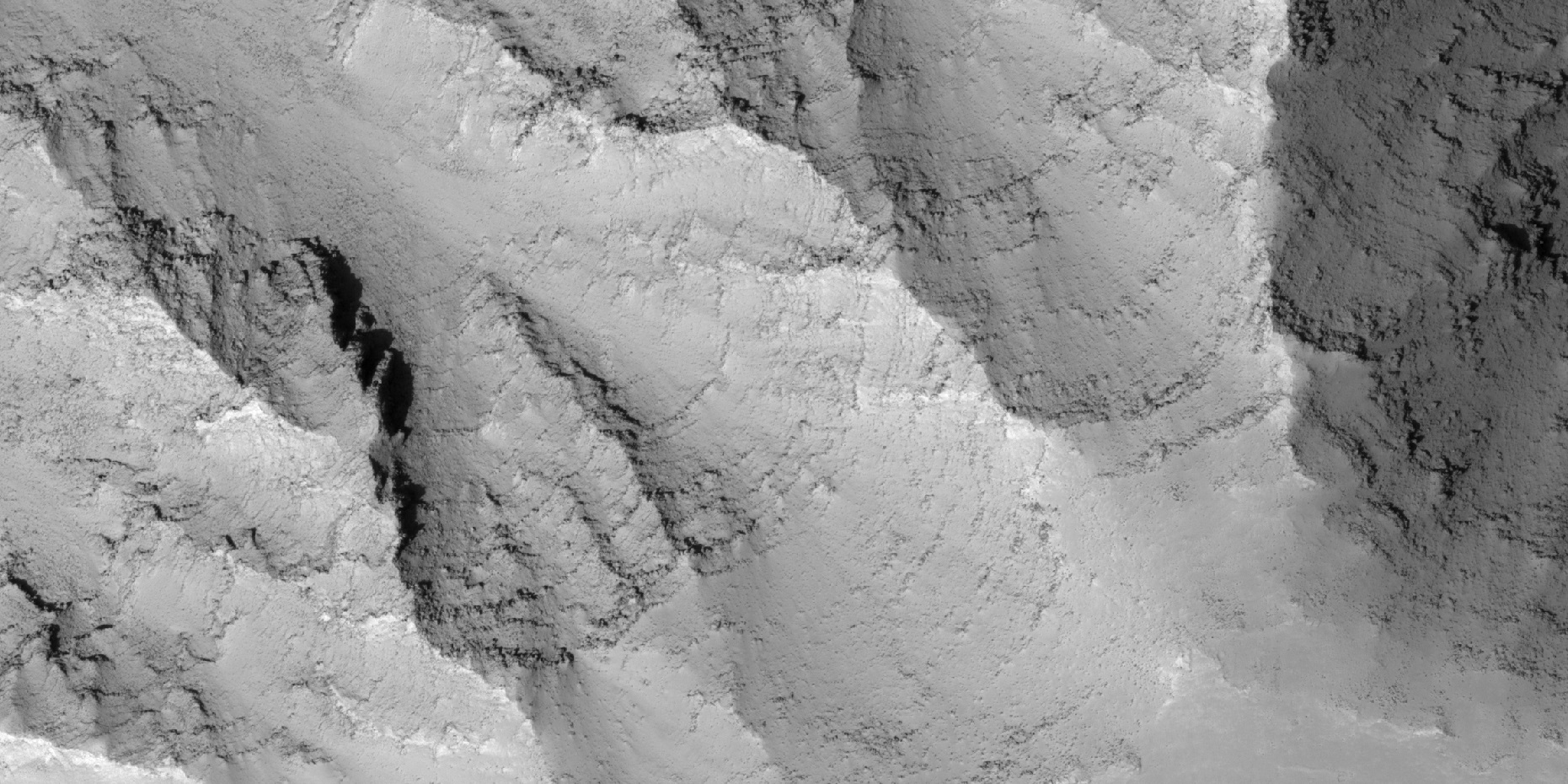
Close view of layers in the Louros Valles, as seen by HiRISE under HiWish program; this is an enlargement of a previous image.

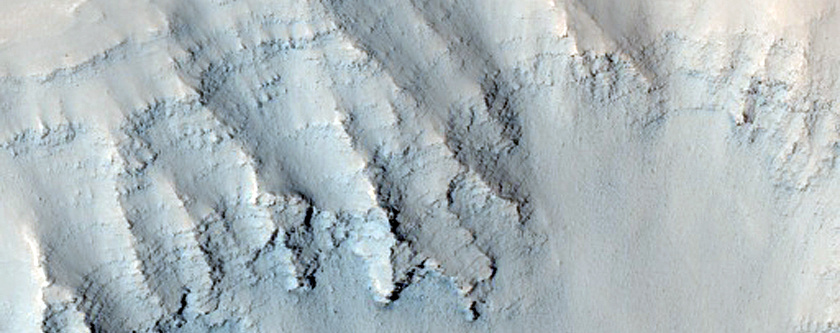
Close view of layers in the Louros Valles, as seen by HiRISE under HiWish program; this is an enlargement of a previous image.
