= Ituxi Vallis =

Vallis on Mars

- Ituxi Vallis, as seen by THEMIS. Ituxi Vallis is a lava channel that lies east of Elysium Mons.
- Coordinates: 25.4°N 207°W
- Naming: a river in Brazil

Ituxi Vallis is a valley in the Elysium quadrangle of Mars, located at 25.4° N and 207° W. It is 62 km long and was named after the Ituxi River in Brazil.
