= Sabrina Vallis =

Valley on Mars

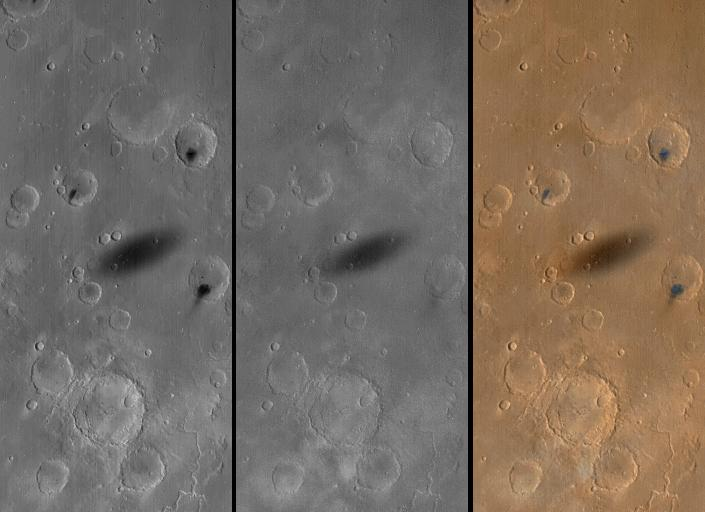
- PIA02342: Mars Orbiter Camera views of the shadow of the Martian moon, Phobos, over Sabrina Vallis
- Location: Lunae Palus quadrangle
- Coordinates: 10.99°N 49.04°W
- Naming: Classical name of the River Severn in England and Wales

Sabrina Vallis is a valley in the Lunae Palus quadrangle of Mars, located at 11.0° North and 49.0° West. It is 280 km long and was named after the classical name of the River Severn in England and Wales.

Sabrina Vallis by THEMIS
