= Her Desher Vallis =

Valles on Mars

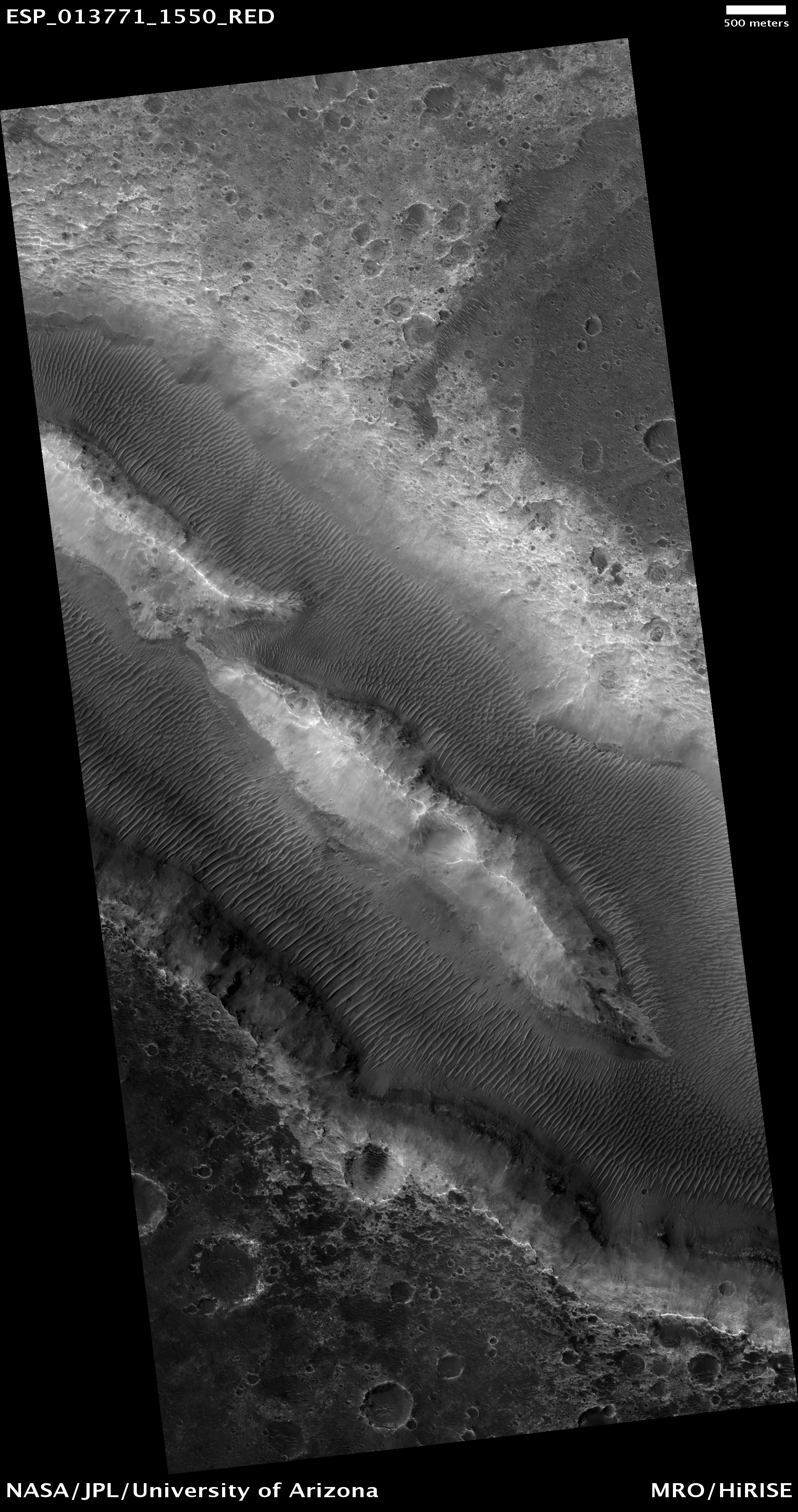
- Her Desher Vallis, as seen by HiRISE.
- Coordinates: 25.4°S 48.0°W

Her Desher Vallis is an ancient river valley in the Coprates quadrangle of Mars, located at 25.4° S and 48.0° W. It is 107.0 km across and was named for the Egyptian name for Mars.

== Images ==
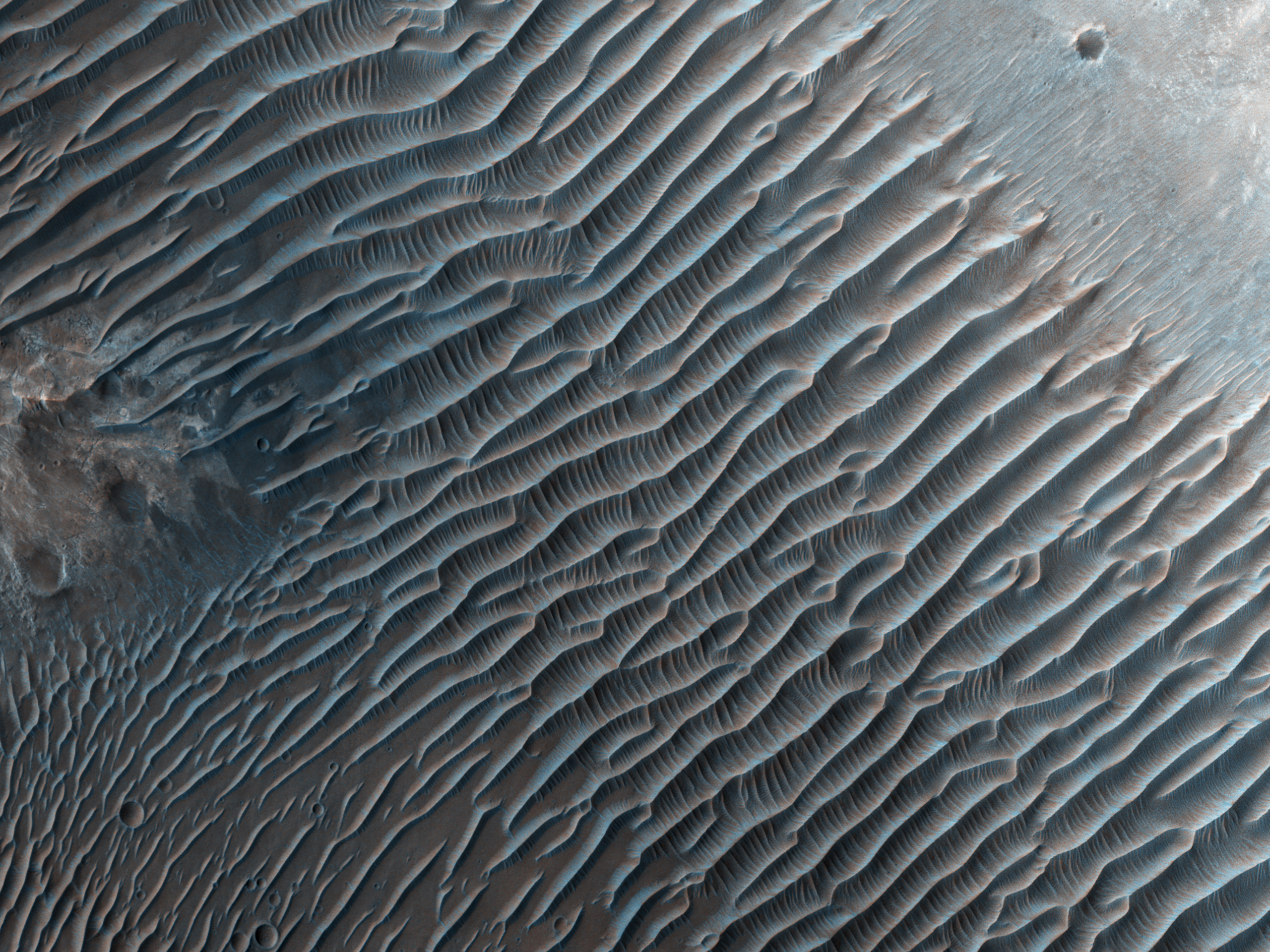
Dune Ripples in Her Desher Vallis, as seen by HiRISE.

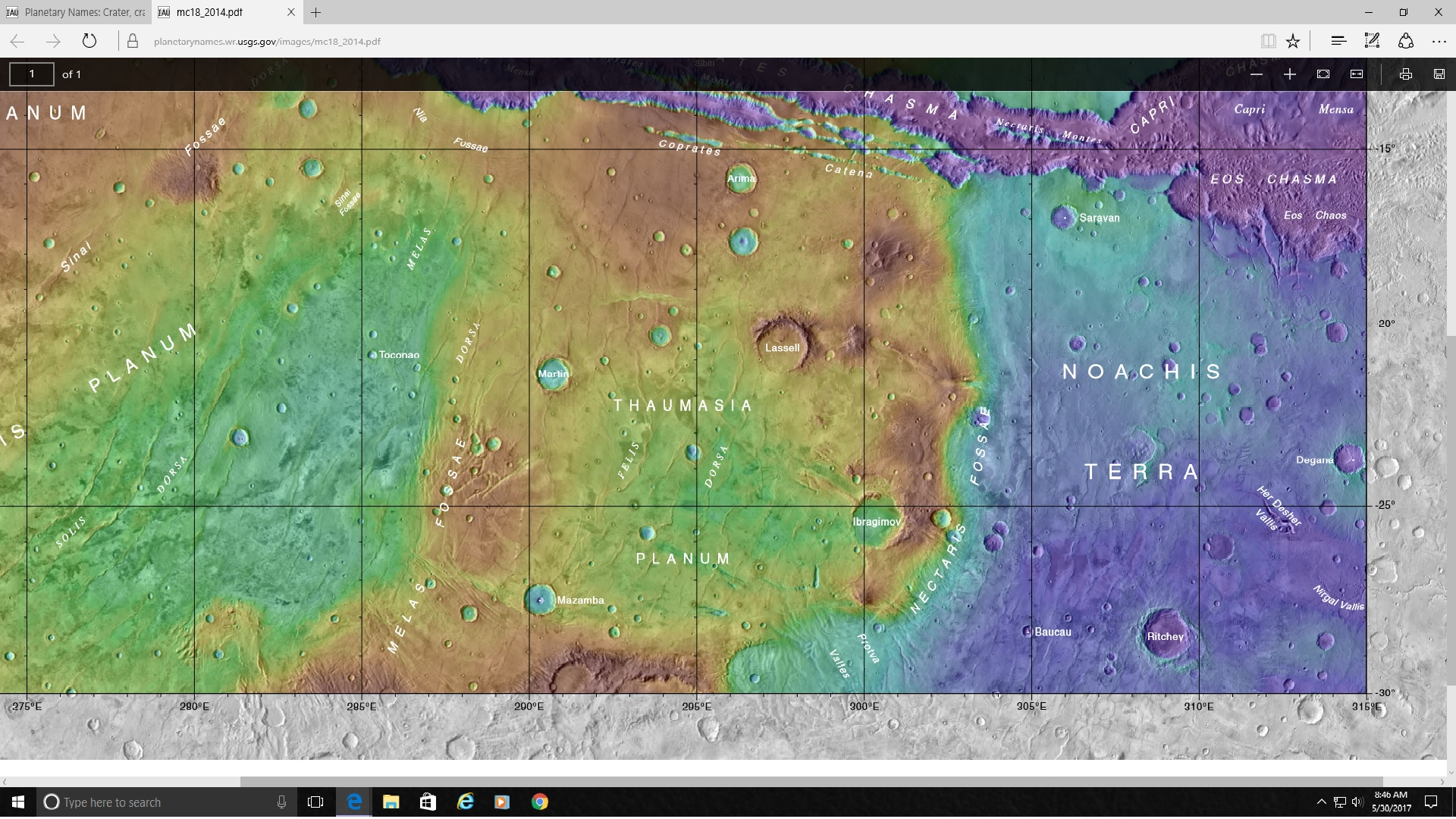
Map showing location of Her Desher Vallis and other features in the region
