= Apsus Vallis =

Vallis on Mars

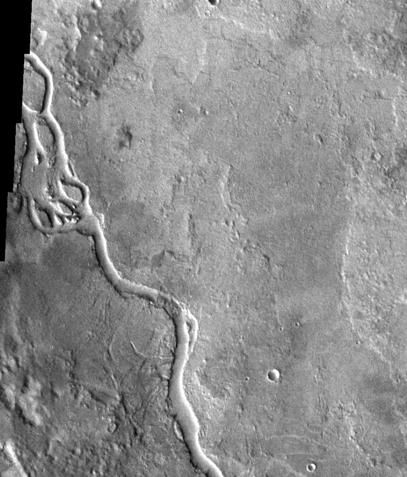
- Apsus Vallis, as seen by THEMIS. Apsus is near the Elysium volcanic system; it may have been partially formed by the action of lava.
- Coordinates: 35.1°N 225°W

Apsus Vallis is a channel in the Cebrenia quadrangle of Mars, located at 35.1° north latitude and 225° west longitude. It is 120 km long and was named after a classical river in ancient Macedonia, the present-day Seman River.
