= Ravi Vallis =

Geographical feature on Mars

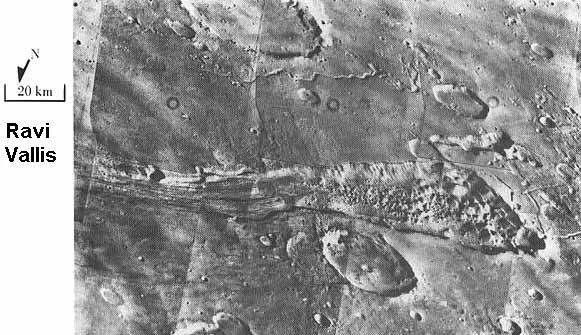
- Ravi Vallis and Aromatum Chaos, as seen by Viking Orbiter
- Coordinates: 0.2°S 40.7°W

Ravi Vallis is an ancient outflow channel, the source of which originates from the Aromatum Chaos depression, and is situated at the eastern end of Xanthe Terra, in the Margaritifer Sinus quadrangle (MC-19) region of Mars, located at 0.2°S 40.7°W. The Ravi Vallis outflow channel is 205.5 km (127.7 mi) long, and starts at the northeastern end of the Aromatum Chaos depression. The channel is orientated in an easterly direction, and further down channel, Ravi Vallis divides into two; a larger northern channel, and a smaller southern channel, and is finally truncated by a fault which is located at the western margin of the Hydraotes Chaos depression. Ravi Vallis was named after the Ravi River, an ancient Indian river.

The Ravi Vallis outflow channel and neighboring deep depression at Aromatum Chaos, are thought to have been caused by volcano-ice interactions underneath the surface, which pierced an underground aquifer. This released large amounts of water, causing a catastrophic flood event, with an estimated speed of between 10 and 25 m s^{−1}. The discharge rates from the Ravi Vallis outflow channel are thought to have ranged from a maximum of ~30 × 10^{6} m^{3} s^{−1} after the beginning of the flood event, to below 10 × 10^{6} m^{3} s^{−1} in its later stages. The flood event is thought to have lasted between 2 and 10 weeks, with an estimated minimum total water volume of somewhere in the range of 11,000 to 65,000 km^{3}.

Intermittent volcanism and related flood events like that which occurred at Ravi Vallis, are known to have occurred in other regions of Mars, such as at Kasei Valles, and Mangala Valles.

== Gallery ==
Ravi Vallis (USGS maps)

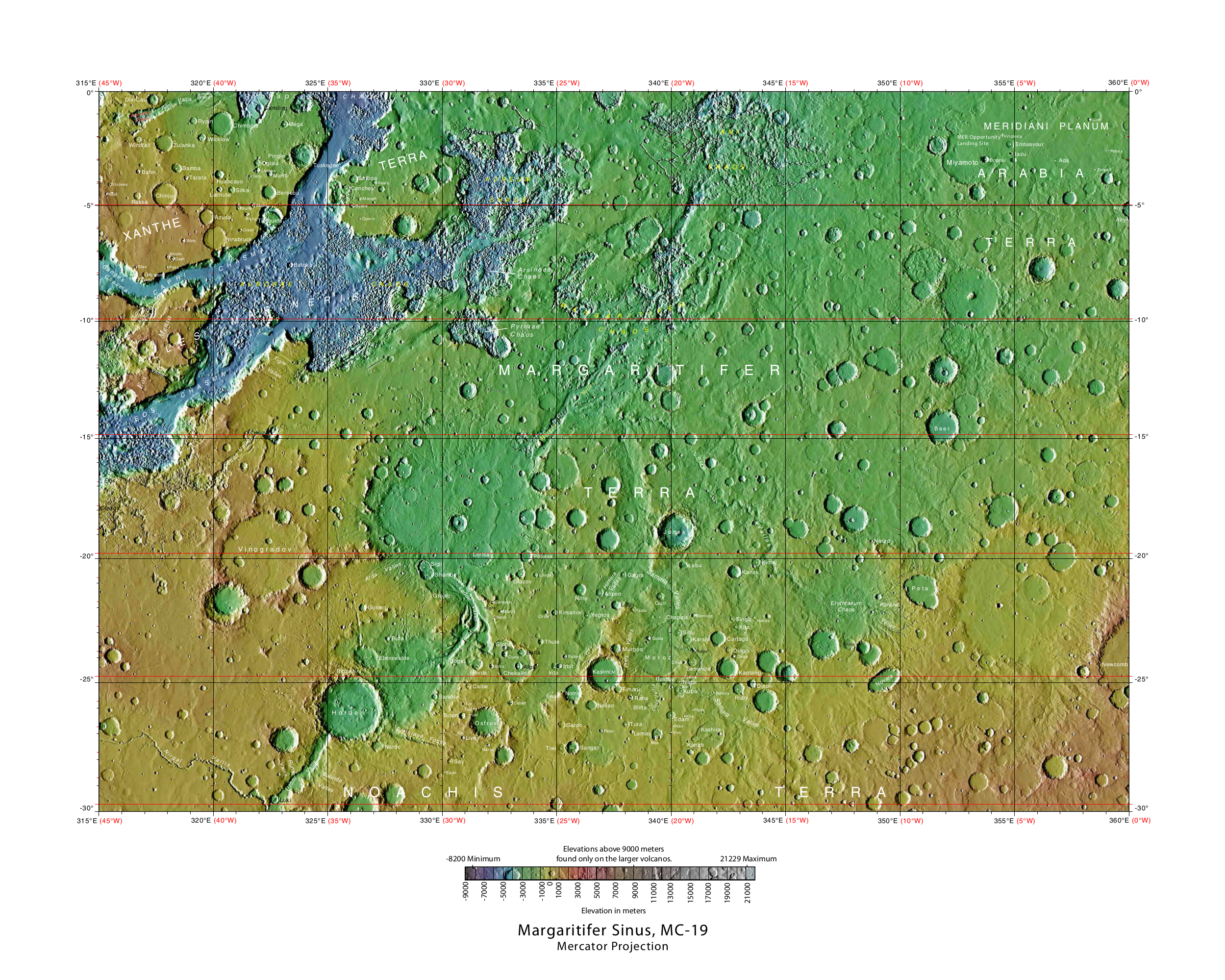
Context

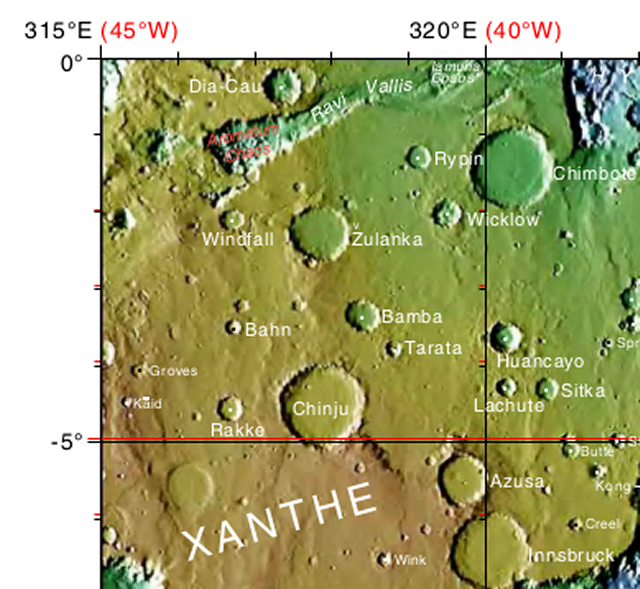
Closer

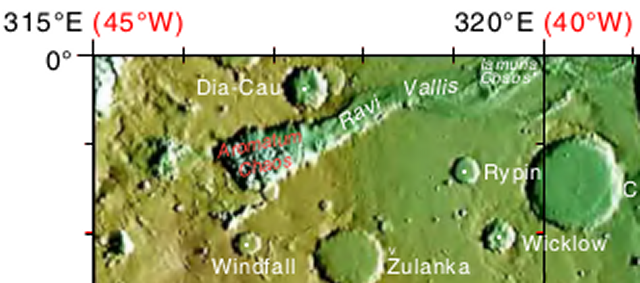
Closest

Topographic maps (MOLA) of the Margaritifer Sinus region of Mars, showing the location of a number of chaos regions and valleys, including Ravi Vallis. Ravi Vallis is located in the top left (0.2°S 40.7°W) of the two upper maps, near the equator.

== See also ==
- Chaotic terrain
- Geology of Mars
- List of areas of chaotic terrain on Mars
- Martian chaotic terrain
- Outburst flood
- Outflow channels
- Vallis (planetary geology)
- Water on Mars
