= Asopus Vallis =

Vallis on Mars

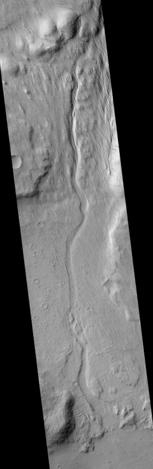
- Asopus Vallis, as seen by HiRISE.
- Coordinates: 4.4°S 149.7°W
- Naming: a classical name for the modern Hagios River, Greece

Asopus Vallis is a valley in the Memnonia quadrangle on Mars, located at 4.4° south latitude and 149.7° west longitude. It is 33 km long and was named after a classical name for the modern Boeotian Asopus river in Greece.
