= Iberus Vallis =

Vallis on Mars

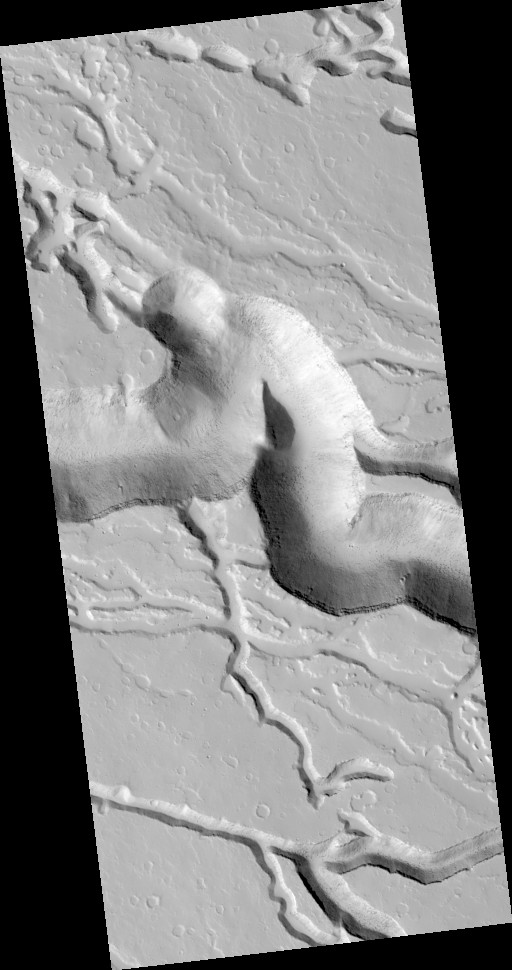
- Wide view of Iberus Vallis, as seen by HiRISE.
- Coordinates: 21.5°N 208.0°W

Iberus Vallis is a valley in the Elysium quadrangle of Mars, located at 21.5° N and 208.0° W. It is 80.2 km long and was named after a classical name for the Ebro River in NE Spain.

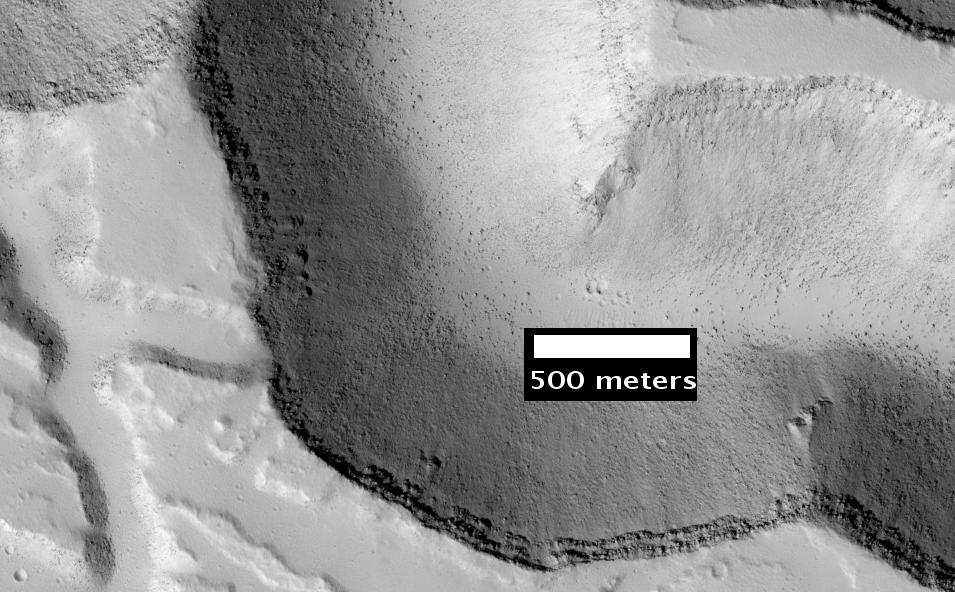
Detail from the center of the previous image, as seen by HiRISE.
