= Samara Valles =

Valles on Mars

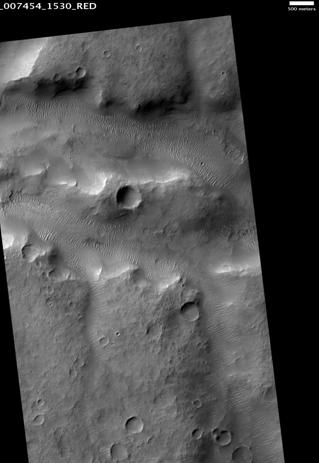
- The Samara Valles, as seen by HiRISE (scale bar is 500 m)
- Coordinates: 25.1°S 19.1°W

The Samara Valles are an elongated set of channels featuring an old valley in the middle of the Margaritifer Sinus quadrangle on Mars. It is located at approximately 25.1° south latitude and 19.1° west longitude. They extend 615 km long and were named after the ancient Roman name for modern Somme River, France in 1976.
