= Verde Vallis =

Ancient river on Mars

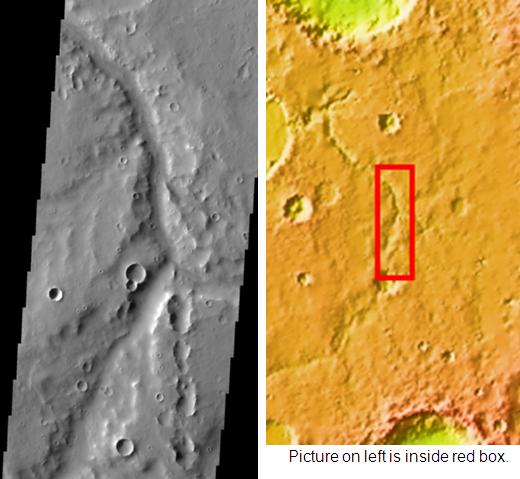
- Verde Vallis, as seen by THEMIS.
- Coordinates: 0.5°S 330.2°W

Verde Vallis is an ancient river valley in the Sinus Sabaeus quadrangle on Mars. It is found in the Sinus Sabaeus quadrangle at 0.5° south latitude and 330.2° west longitude. It is named after a river in Arizona, USA.

== See also ==
- Geology of Mars
- Vallis (planetary geology)
- Water on Mars
