= Padus Vallis =

Valley on the planet Mars

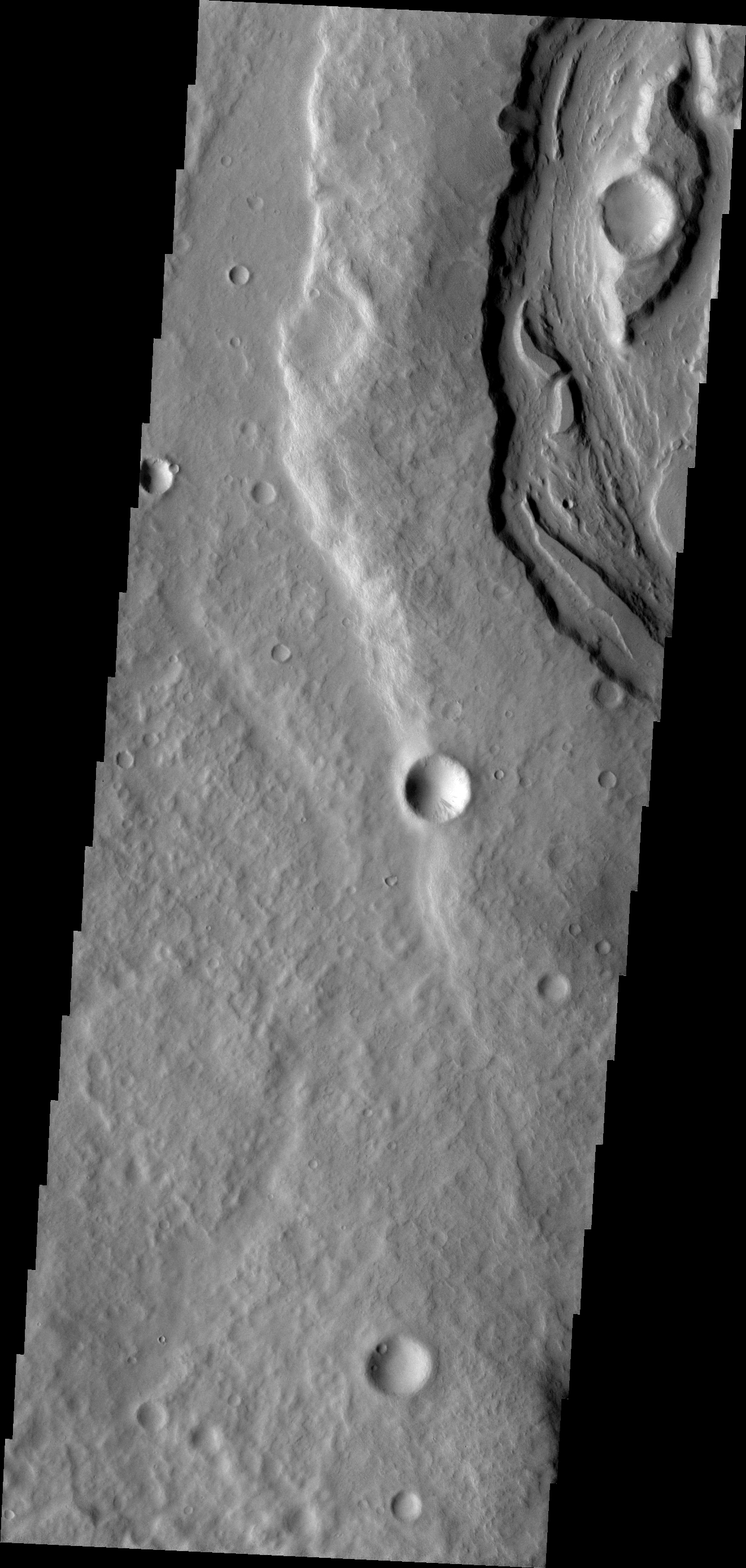
- Padus Vallis, as seen by THEMIS.
- Coordinates: 4.6°S 150.1°W

Padus Vallis is a valley in the Memnonia quadrangle on Mars that empties into the Medusa Fossae Formation. It is located at 4.6° S and 150.1° W. It is 46.0 km long and was named for the classical name for modern Po Valley in Italy. Padus Vallis is one of many valleys that empty into the Medusae Fossae Formation.

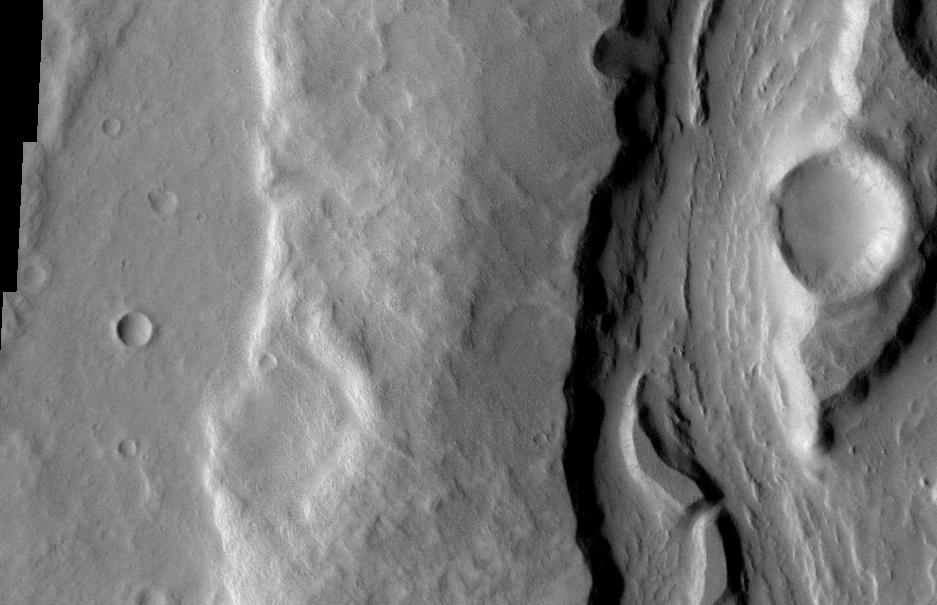
Close-up of Padus Vallis, as seen by THEMIS.
