= Sabis Vallis =

Valley on Mars named after the river Sabis

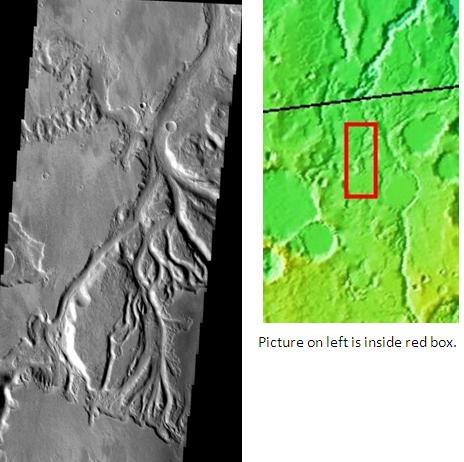
- Sabis Vallis, as seen by THEMIS. The small channels are joining to form Sabis Vallis.
- Coordinates: 5.3°S 152.5°W

Sabis Vallis is an ancient river valley in the Memnonia quadrangle of Mars, located at 5.3° south latitude and 152.5° west longitude. It is 206 km long and was named after a classical name for the present Sambre River in France and Belgium.
