= Stura Vallis =

Ancient river

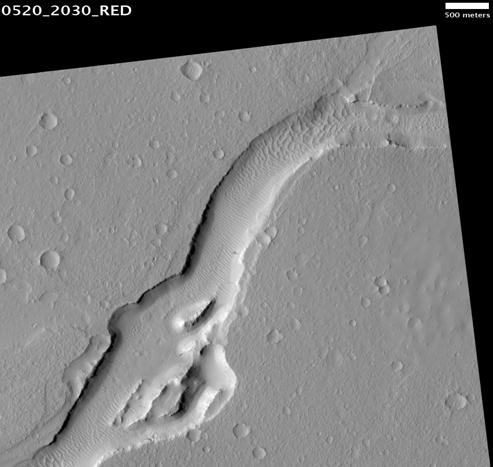
- Stura Vallis, as seen by HiRISE. Scale bar is 500 meters long.
- Coordinates: 22.9°N 217.6°W

Stura Vallis is an ancient river valley in the Elysium quadrangle of Mars, located at 22.9° north latitude and 217.6° west longitude. It is 75 km long and was named after a classical river east of Rome, Italy.
