= Mangala Valles =

Geographical feature on Mars

- The Mangala Valles and Mangala Fossa (THEMIS image)
- Coordinates: 11.6°S 151.0°W
- Length: 828.0 km

The Mangala Valles are a complex system of criss-crossing channels on Mars, located in the Tharsis region and in the Memnonia quadrangle. They originated in the Hesperian and Amazonian epochs. They are thought to be an outflow channel system, carved by catastrophic floods, and the release of vast quantities of water across the Martian surface. This flooding was probably initiated by tectonic stretching and the formation of a graben, Mangala Fossa, at the channels' head, perhaps breaching a pressurized aquifer trapped beneath a thick "cryosphere" (layer of frozen ground) beneath the surface. The Mangala Valles contain several basins; after they filled, the overflow went through a series of spillways. One source of waters for the system was the Memonia Fossae, but water also probably came from a large basin centered at 40 degrees S.

A recent study that used photogeologic analysis, geomorphic surface mapping, cratering statistics, and relative stratigraphy, demonstrated that the Mangala Valles were flooded by water at least twice and covered with lava at least three times during the Late Amazonian. The presence of scoured bedrock at the base of the mapped stratigraphy, together with evidence from crater retention ages, suggests that fluvial activity came before lava flows. These alternating periods of aqueous flooding and volcanism are similar to that of other outflow systems on Mars, such as Ravi Vallis and the Kasei Valles.

There are wind-sculpted ridges, or yardangs, covering many of the surfaces in the Mangala Valles region.

"Mangala" is the name for Mars in Jyotish (or Hindu) astrology.

== Gallery ==
The Mangala Valles and Mangala Fossa (USGS maps)

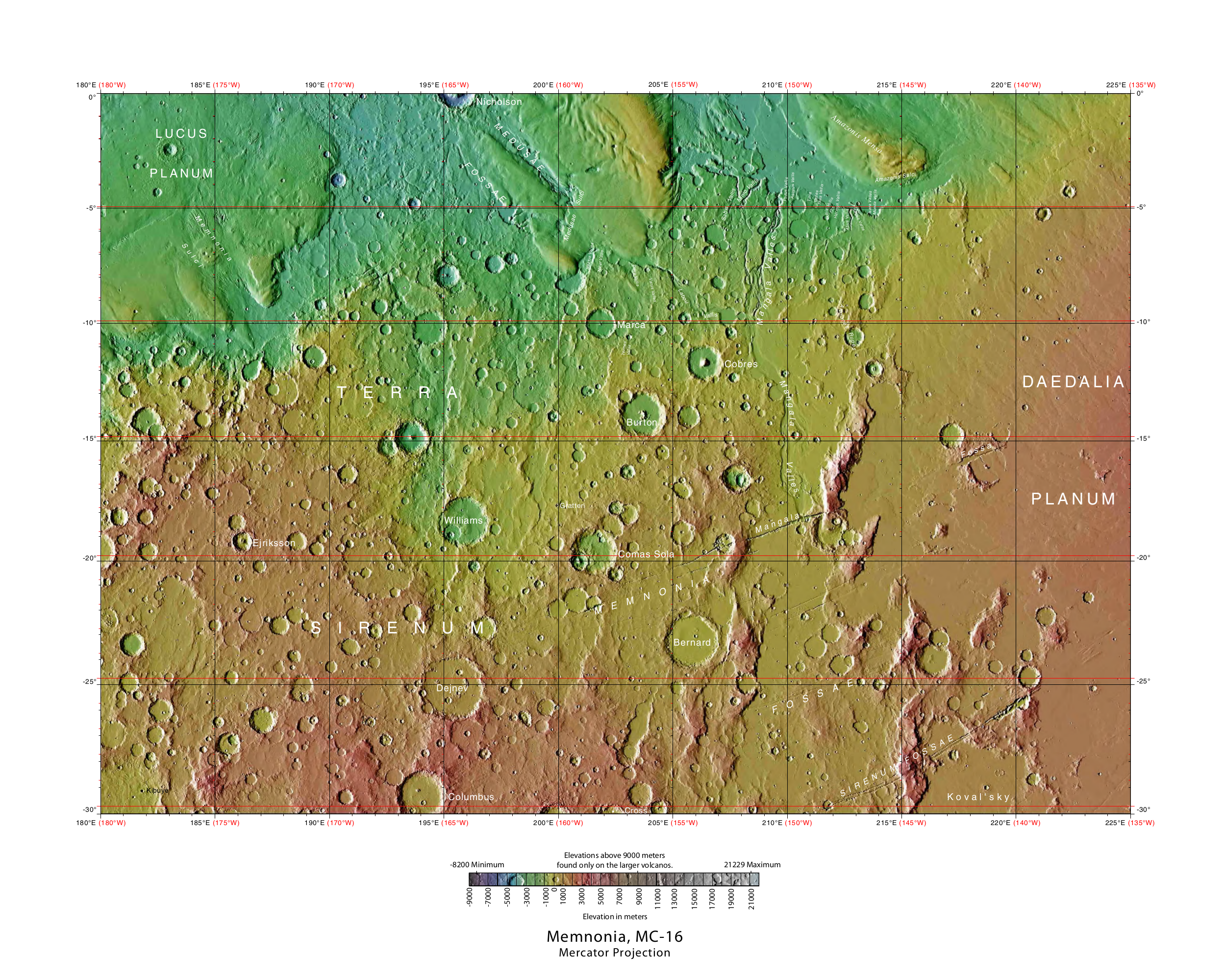
Context

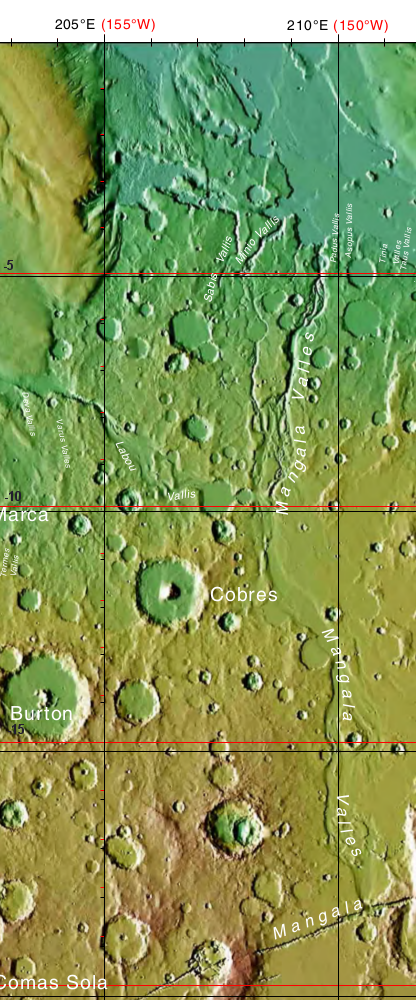
Close-up

Topographic maps (MOLA) – Memnonia region of Mars (left); and a close-up (right) of the location of Mangala Fossa and the source of the Mangala Valles outflow channels.
A streamlined island within the Mangala Valles, as seen by THEMIS.

The Mangala Valles, as seen by HiRISE.

== In fiction ==
- The Mangala Valles are referred to in Michael Crichton's book Sphere.
- In Stephen Baxter's novel Voyage, they are the location of the first crewed Mars landing.
- They are mentioned in Terry Pratchett's and Stephen Baxter's novel The Long Mars.
- They are also the location of the first crewed Mars base in Codex Regius (1999). Horsemen of Mars. ISBN 978-1499274578.

== See also ==
- Graben
- Memnonia quadrangle
- Outburst flood
- Outflow channels
