= Arnas =

Arnas may refer to:

- Arnas, Rhône, a commune in France
- Arnas, Portugal, a civil parish in Sernancelhe, Portugal
- Arnäs (disambiguation), several places in Sweden
- Arnas (given name), a Lithuanian given name (including a list of people with the name)

== See also ==
- Arna (disambiguation)
- Arnes (disambiguation)
- Arnus (disambiguation)
