= Arnus =

Arnus may refer to:

- Arno, known in Latin as Arnus, a river in Italy
- Arnus Vallis, a valley on Mars
- an alter ego of the DC comics superhero Icon
- SS Arnus, a Spanish ship shipwrecked in 1921

== See also ==
- Arnos
- Arnas (disambiguation)
