= Årnäs, Sweden =

Årnäs, Sweden may refer to:

- Årnäs, Halland
- Årnäs, Värmland
- Årnäs, Västra Götaland

== See also ==
- Ärnäs, Sweden (disambiguation)
- Arnäsvall in Västernorrland, Sweden
