= Arnäs =

Arnäs may refer to:

- Arnäs Court District
- Ärnäs, Sweden (disambiguation)
- Årnäs, Sweden (disambiguation)
- Arnis (Danish: Arnæs), Schleswig-Holstein, Germany
