= Arnes =

Arnes may refer to:

- ARNES, Academic and Research Network of Slovenia
- Arnes, Manitoba, Canada
  - Arnes Airport, located northeast of Arnes, Manitoba, Canada
- Arnes, Terra Alta, a town in Catalonia, Spain
- Årnes, the administrative centre of Nes municipality, Akershus, Norway
  - Årnes Station, a railway station located in Årnes

== See also ==
- Aarnes, a surname
- Arnas (disambiguation)
