= Arnas (given name) =

- Gender: Male

Origin
- Region of origin: Lithuania

Other names
- Related names: Arnoldas

Arnas is a Lithuanian masculine given name, often a diminutive of Arnoldas, and may refer to:

- Arnas Beručka (born 1997), Lithuanian basketball player
- Arnas Butkevičius (born 1992), Lithuanian professional basketball player
- Arnas Labuckas (born 1987), Lithuanian basketball player
- Arnas Velička (born 1999), Lithuanian professional basketball
