= Mad Vallis =

Mars geographical feature

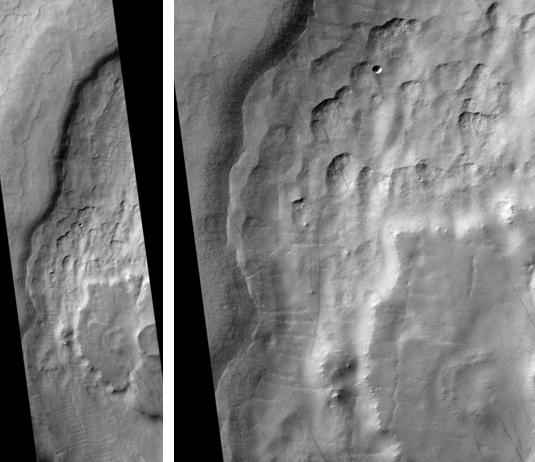
- Mad Vallis, as seen by HiRISE. Picture on right is an enlargement of part of the other picture.
- Coordinates: 56.5°S 283.9°W

Mad Vallis is a vallis (valley) in the Hellas quadrangle of Mars, with its location centered at 56.5° S and 283.9° W. It is 524 km long and was named after the Mad River in Vermont, USA.
