= Aarnes =

Aarnes or Årnes is a Norwegian surname. Notable people with the surname include:

- Asbjørn Aarnes (1923–2013), Norwegian literary historian
- Hans Aarnes (1886–1960), Norwegian journalist
- Sverre Årnes (born 1949), Norwegian writer
- Tom Aage Aarnes (born 1977), Norwegian ski jumper

== See also ==
- Arnes (disambiguation)
