= Frento Vallis =

Valley on Mars

- Frento Vallis, as seen by HiRISE. Click on image to see better view of Dust Devil Tracks.
- Coordinates: 50.3°S 14.5°W

Frento Vallis is a valley in the Noachis quadrangle of Mars, with a location centered at 50.3 S and 14.5 W. It is 277 km long and was named after the classical name for a river in Italy.

== See also ==
- Geology of Mars
- HiRISE
- Vallis (planetary geology)
- Water on Mars
