= Arnäs, Sweden =

Ärnäs, Sweden may refer to:

- Arnäs, Älvdalen, Dalarna
- Arnäs, Malung-Sälen, Dalarna
- Arnäsvall in Västernorrland, Sweden
- Arnäs parish in Västernorrland, Sweden

== See also ==
- Årnäs, Sweden (disambiguation)
