= Arnos =

- Commune
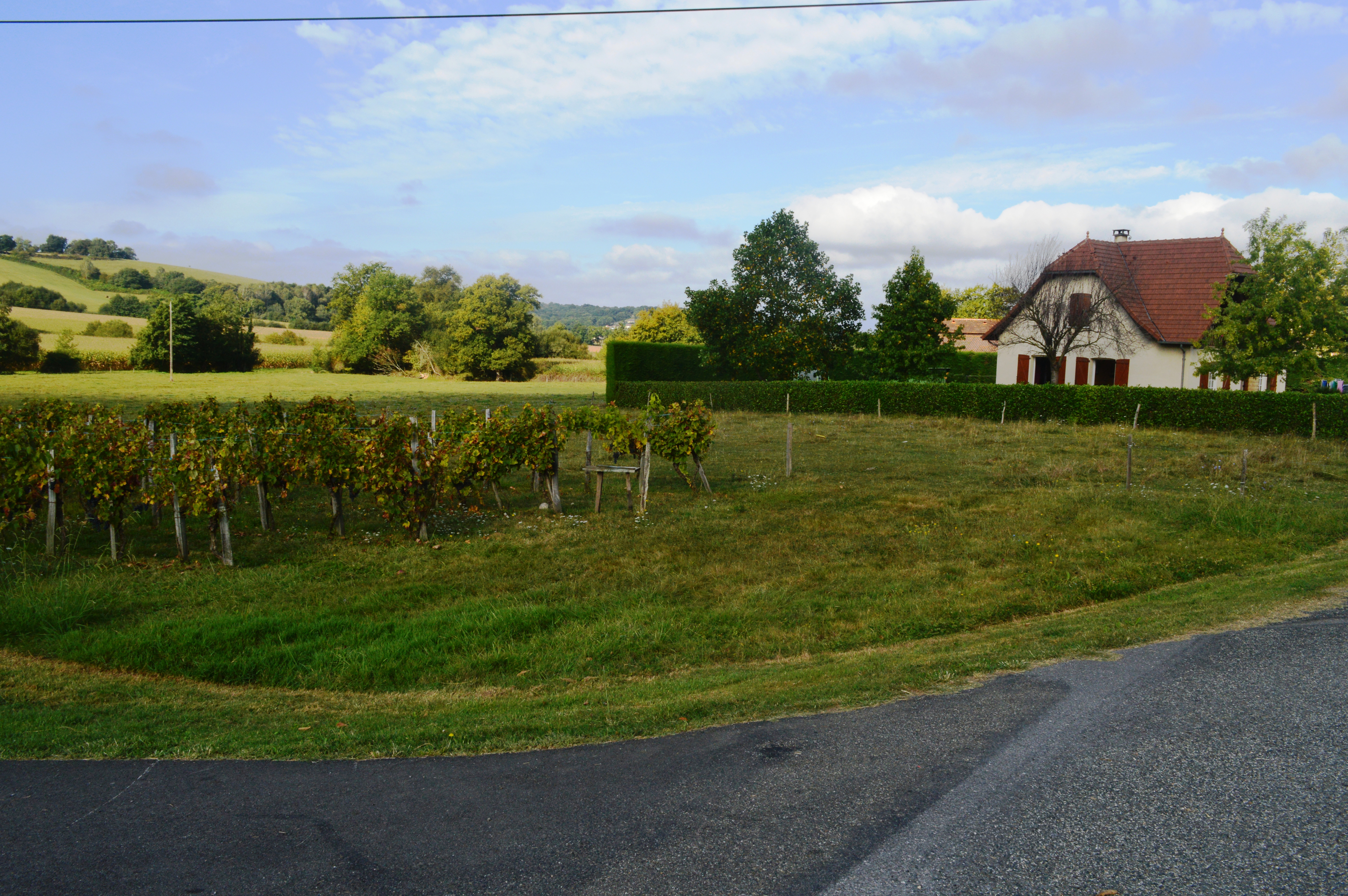
- A general view of Arnos

- Coat of arms
- Location of Arnos
- Location within France Location within Nouvelle-Aquitaine
- Coordinates: 43°27′29″N 0°31′54″W
- Country: France
- Region: Nouvelle-Aquitaine
- Department: Pyrénées-Atlantiques
- Arrondissement: Pau
- Canton: Artix et Pays de Soubestre
- Intercommunality: CC Lacq-Orthez

Government
  - Mayor (2020–2026): Alain Pédegert
- Area^{1}: 5.69 km^{2} (2.20 sq mi)
- Elevation: 155 m (509 ft)
- Highest elevation: 232 m (761 ft)
- Lowest elevation: 133 m (436 ft)
- Population (2023): 131
  - Density: 23.0/km^{2} (59.6/sq mi)
- Time zone: UTC+01:00 (CET)
  - Summer (DST): UTC+02:00 (CEST)
- INSEE/Postal code: 64048 /64370
- ^{1} French Land Register data, which excludes lakes, ponds, glaciers > 1 km^{2} (0.386 sq mi or 247 acres) and river estuaries.

Arnos (French pronunciation: [aʁnɔs]; Occitan: Arnós) is a commune in the Pyrénées-Atlantiques department in the Nouvelle-Aquitaine region of south-western France.

== Geography ==
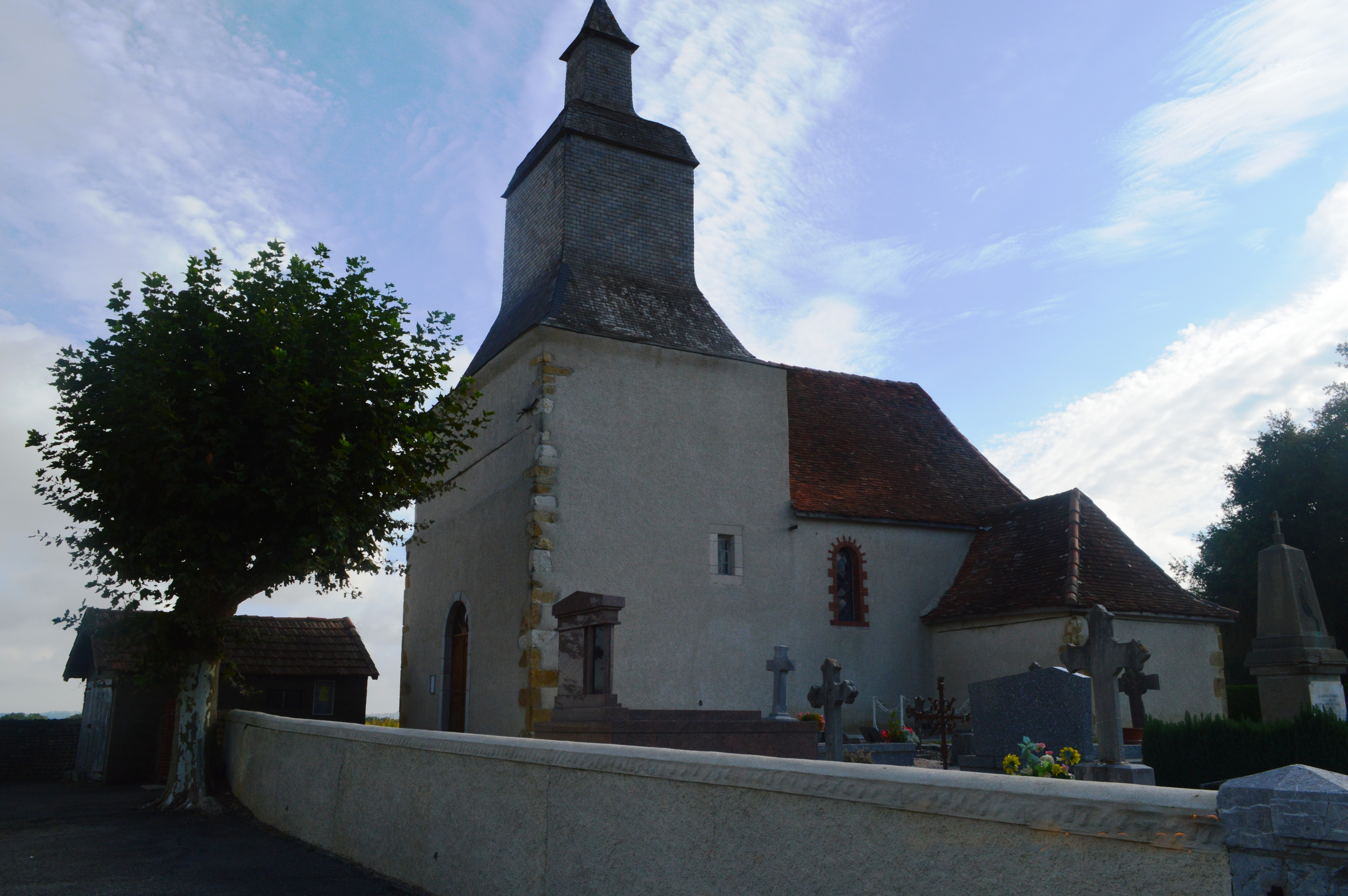
Arnos Church

Arnos is located some 25 km north-west of Pau and 10 km east of Arthez-de-Béarn. Access to the commune is by road D276 from Castillon in the west passing through the commune and the village and continuing south-east then east to join the D945. There is a large Formula 3 racetrack in the south of the commune run by the Moto Club Pau-Arnos. The commune consists of farmland except for a few small patches of forest.

The river Aubin, a tributary of the Luy de Béarn (Adour basin), flows through the commune.

=== Places and Hamlets ===
- Bousquet
- Carracou
- Cassauba
- Castandet
- Castéra
- Marquine
- Monplaisir
- Montagut
- Pallane
- Pédoussau
- Péré
- Péruilh
- Péruillet
- Pétrou
- Poey (ruins)
- Saintong
- Sansot

== Toponymy ==
The name Arnos appears in the form Arnas on the Cassini Map.

== History ==
In the 16th century, Arnos was an annex of Boumourt.

== Administration ==
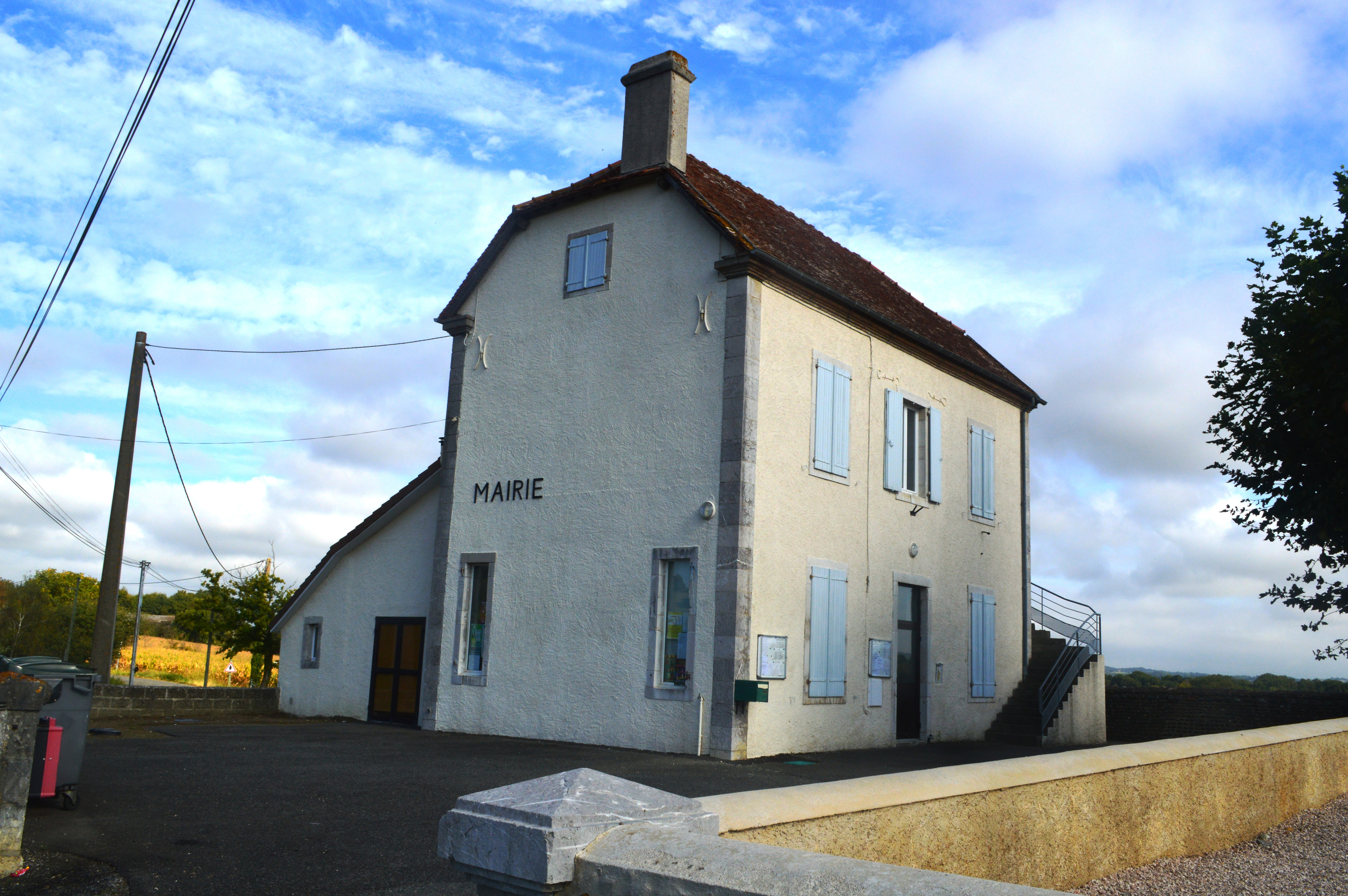
The Town Hall

List of Successive Mayors

From	To	Name
1832	1852	Henri Pétrou
1995	2001	André Bourdieu
2001	2026	Alain Pédegert

=== Inter-communality ===
Arnos is part of four inter-communal structures:

- the Communauté de communes de Lacq-Orthez;
- the Water and sanitation association of Trois Cantons;
- the Energy association of Pyrénées-Atlantiques;
- the inter-communal association of Arthez-de-Béarn.

== Demography ==
The inhabitants of the commune are known as Arnosiens or Arnosiennes in French.

Historical population

Year	Pop.	±% p.a.
1793	252	—
1821	290	+0.50%
1846	259	−0.45%
1872	198	−1.03%
1901	158	−0.78%
1926	118	−1.16%
1946	99	−0.87%
1962	71	−2.06%
1968	74	+0.69%

Year	Pop.	±% p.a.
1975	63	−2.27%
1982	70	+1.52%
1990	68	−0.36%
1999	68	+0.00%
2007	67	−0.19%
2012	80	+3.61%
2017	113	+7.15%
2023	131	+2.49%

Source: EHESS and INSEE

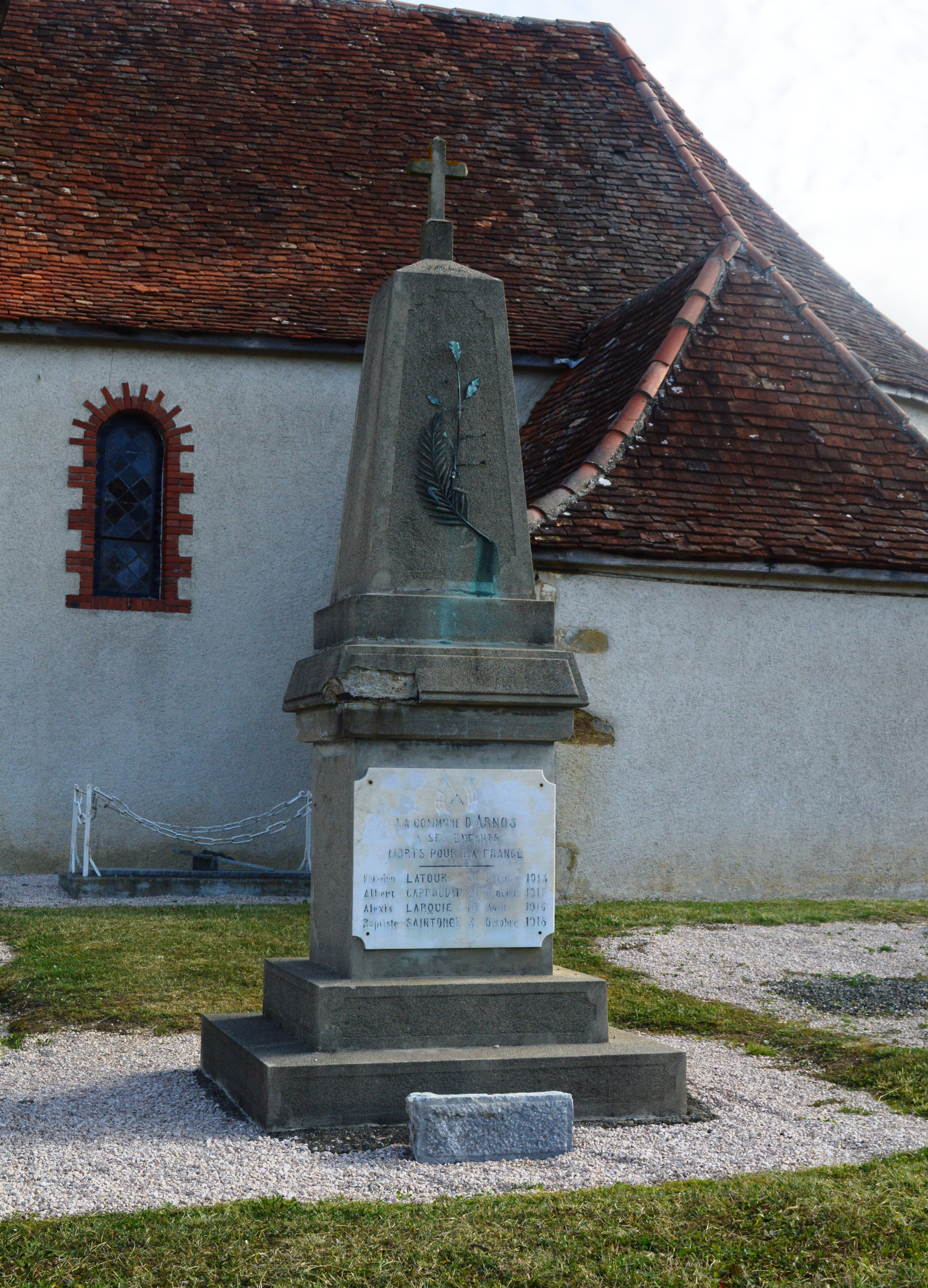
Arnos War Memorial

== Sports Venues ==
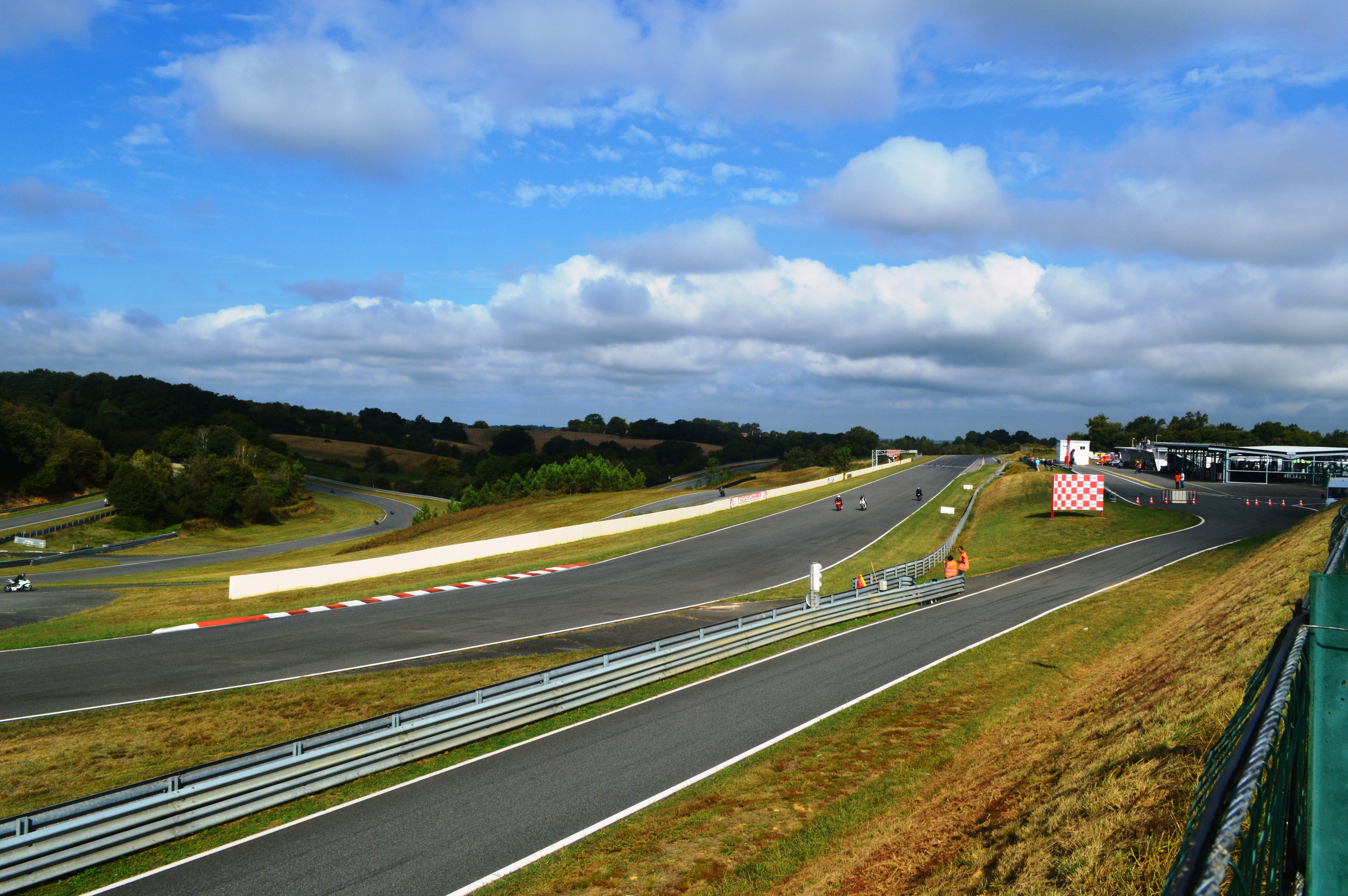
circuit Pau-Arnos Race Track

The racing Circuit Pau-Arnos is in the south of the commune.

== See also ==
- Communes of the Pyrénées-Atlantiques department
