= Årnäs, Värmland =

Settlement in Arvika Municipality, Sweden

Coordinates: 59°40′N 12°55′E

Årnäs is a village in Arvika Municipality, Värmland County, Sweden.
