= Årnäs =

- Location within Sweden
- Coordinates: 57°12′N 12°13′E
- Country: Sweden
- County: Halland
- Municipality: Varberg

Area
  - Total: 3.66 km^{2} (1.41 sq mi)

Årnäs is a village in Halland County, Sweden.

== Demographics ==
Population over time for Årnäs
Date	2015-12-31	2020-12-31	2023-12-31
Population	679	730	75
