= Arnoldas =

Arnoldas is a Lithuanian masculine given name. Notable people with the name include:

- Arnoldas Burkovskis (born 1967), Lithuanian bank manager and politician
- Arnoldas Kulboka (born 1998), Lithuanian profession basketball player
- Arnoldas Lukošius (born 1967), Lithuanian keyboardist
