= Arnäsvall =

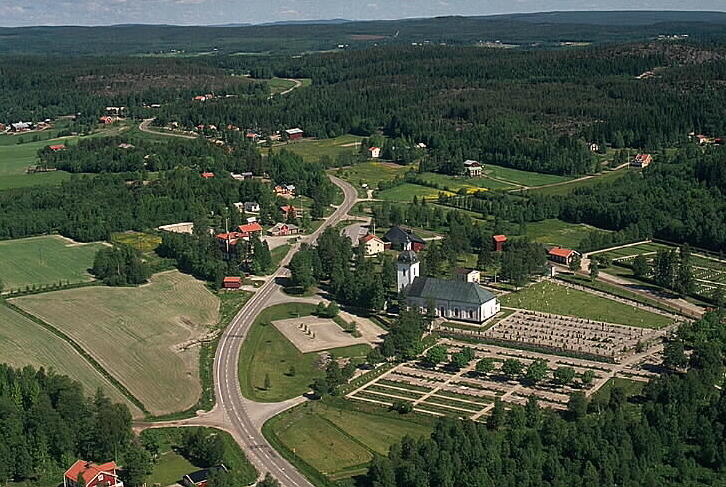

- Location within Västernorrland Location within Sweden
- Coordinates: 63°19′N 18°47′E
- Country: Sweden
- Province: Ångermanland
- County: Västernorrland County
- Municipality: Örnsköldsvik Municipality

Area
  - Total: 0.83 km^{2} (0.32 sq mi)

Population (31 December 2010)
  - Total: 341
  - Density: 409/km^{2} (1,060/sq mi)
- Time zone: UTC+1 (CET)
  - Summer (DST): UTC+2 (CEST)
- Climate: Dfc

Arnäsvall is a locality situated in Örnsköldsvik Municipality, Västernorrland County, Sweden with 341 inhabitants in 2010.
