= Arnus Vallis =

Vallis on Mars

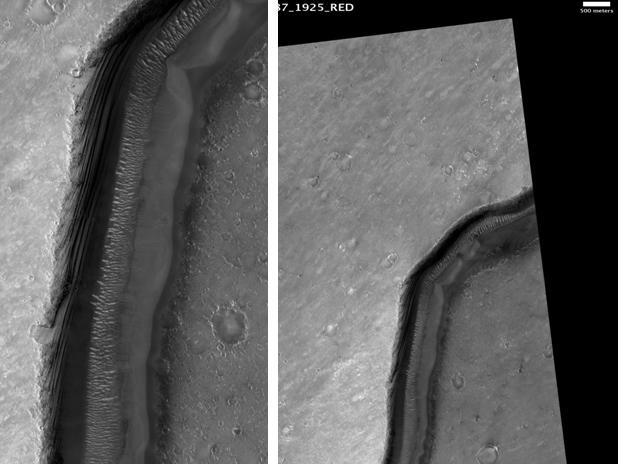
- Arnus Vallis Layers, as seen by HiRISE. Scale bar is 500 meters long.
- Coordinates: 14.1°N 289.5°W

Arnus Vallis is an ancient river valley in the Syrtis Major quadrangle of Mars, located at 14.1° north latitude and 289.5° west longitude. It is 280 km long and was named after the classical and present day Arno River in Tuscany, Italy (previously named Arena Rupes).

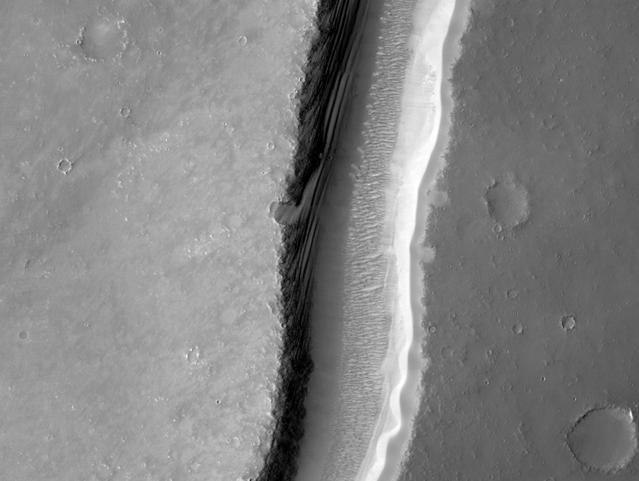
Arnus Vallis layers, as seen by HiRISE.
